This is a complete list of settlements in Bosnia and Herzegovina, as recorded by 1991 population census in Bos.

City of Sarajevo

Sarajevo – Centar 
Mrkovići
• Nahorevo
• Poljine
• Radava
• Sarajevo (part of settlement)
• Vića

Sarajevo – Ilidža (FBiH) 
Buhotina
• Gornje Mladice
• Jasen
• Kakrinje
• Kasindo
• Kobiljača
• Krupac
• Rakovica
• Rudnik
• Sarajevo (part of settlement)
• Vela
• Vlakovo
• Zenik
• Zoranovići

Istočna Ilidža (RS)

Sarajevo – Novi Grad (FBiH) 
Bojnik
• Rječica 
• Otoka • Buča potok • Boljakov potok • Briješće • Rajlovac • Reljevo dom • Halilovići • Alipašino polje • Dobrinja • Neđarići • Švrakino selo • Mojmilo • Saraj polje • Sokolje • Aerodromsko naselje • Aneks • Sarajevo (part of settlement)

Sarajevo – Novo Sarajevo 
Klek
• Kozarevići
• Lukavica
• Miljevići
• Petrovići
• Sarajevo (part of settlement)
• Toplik
• Tvrdimići

Istočno Novo Sarajevo (RS)

Sarajevo – Stari Grad (FBiH) 
Barice
• Blizanci
• Bulozi
• Donje Biosko
• Donje Međuše
• Dovlići
• Faletići
• Gornje Biosko
• Gornje Međuše
• Hreša
• Kumane
• Močioci
• Njemanica
• Sarajevo (part of settlement)
• Studenkovići
• Vučja Luka

Istočni Stari Grad (RS)

Hadžići 
Bare
• Beganovi
• Binježevo
• Budmolići
• Buturovići kod Drozgometve
• Buturovići kod Osenika
• Crepljani
• Češće
• Čičke
• Deovići
• Do
• Doljani
• Donja Bioča
• Donja Raštelica
• Donji Hadžići
• Donji Zovik
• Dragovići
• Drozgometva
• Dub
• Dupovci
• Duranovići
• Ferhatlije
• Garovci
• Gornja Bioča
• Gornja Raštelica
• Gornji Zovik
• Gradac
• Grivići
• Grude
• Hadžići
• Japalaci
• Jeleč
• Karaosmanovići
• Kasatići
• Kazina Bara
• Korča
• Košćan
• Kućice
• Lihovci
• Lokve
• Luke
• Ljubovčići
• Medvjedice
• Miševići
• Mokrine
• Odžak
• Orahovica
• Osenik
• Pazarić
• Ramići
• Resnik
• Sejdanovići
• Smucka
• Tarčin
• Trnčići
• Trzanj
• Urduk
• Ušivak
• Vrančići
• Vrbanja
• Vukovići
• Žunovica

Ilijaš
Balibegovići
• Banjer
• Bokšići
• Buljetovina
• Čemernica
• Četojevići
• Donja Bioča
• Donja Misoča
• Donje Selo
• Donji Čevljanovići
• Dragoradi
• Draževići
• Duboki Potok
• Duševine
• Gajevi
• Gajine
• Gojanovići
• Gornja Bioča
• Gornja Misoča
• Gornji Čevljanovići
• Hadžići
• Han Karaula
• Han Šići
• Homar
• Ilijaš
• Ivančići
• Kadarići
• Kamenica
• Karaula
• Korita
• Košare
• Kožlje
• Krčevine
• Krivajevići
• Kunosići
• Lađevići
• Lipnik
• Luka
• Luka kod Stublina
• Lješevo
• Ljubina
• Ljubnići
• Malešići
• Medojevići
• Moševići
• Mrakovo
• Nišići
• Odžak
• Ozren
• Podlipnik
• Podlugovi
• Popovići
• Rakova Noga
• Ribarići
• Rudnik Čevljanovići
• Sirovine
• Solakovići
• Sovrle
• Srednje
• Stomorine
• Stubline
• Sudići
• Šabanci
• Šljeme
• Taračin Do
• Velika Njiva
• Vidotina
• Vilić
• Visojevica
• Višnjica
• Vladojevići
• Vlaškovo
• Vrutci
• Vukasovići
• Vuknići
• Zakutnica
• Zlotege

Pale 
Bjelogorci
• Bljuštevac
• Bogovići
• Brdarići
• Brdo
• Brezovice
• Brnjica
• Brojnići
• Buđ
• Čeljadinići
• Čemernica
• Ćemanovići
• Datelji
• Donja Ljubogošta
• Donja Vinča
• Gluhovići
• Gornja Ljubogošta
• Gornja Vinča
• Gornje Pale
• Gornji Pribanj
• Gorovići
• Gradac
• Gute
• Hotočina
• Jahorina
• Jasik
• Jelovci
• Kadino Selo
• Kamenica
• Kasidoli
• Komrani
• Kosmaj
• Kostreša
• Kračule
• Luke
• Miošići
• Modrik
• Mokro
• Nehorići
• Pale
• Pavlovac
• Petovići
• Podgrab
• Podloznik
• Podmedenik
• Podvitez
• Ponor
• Prača
• Prutine
• Pustopolje
• Radonjići
• Rakite
• Rakovac
• Renovica
• Rogoušići
• Rosulje
• Saice
• Sinjevo
• Sjetlina
• Srednje
• Stajna
• Stambolčić
• Strane
• Sumbulovac
• Šainovići
• Šip
• Turkovići
• Udež
• 
• Vlahovići

Pale-Prača (FBiH)

Trnovo (FBiH) 

Balbašići
• Bašci
• Bistročaj
• Bobovica
• Boljanovići
• Brda
• Brutusi
• Čeružići
• Češina Strana
• Čunčići
• Dejčići
• Delijaš
• Divčići
• Donja Presjenica
• Dujmovići
• Durakovići
• Godinja
• Gornja Presjenica
• Govedovići
• Gračanica
• Hamzići
• Ilovice
• Jelačići
• Karovići
• Kozija Luka
• Kramari
• Krsmanići
• Ledići
• Lisovići
• Lukavac
• Mađari
• Mijanovići
• Obla Brda
• Ostojići
• Pendičići
• Pomenovići
• Prečani
• Rakitnica
• Rijeka
• Sjeverovići
• Slavljevići
• Šabanci
• Šabići
• Šišići
• Trebečaj
• Trnovo
• Tušila
• Umčani
• Umoljani
• Vrbovnik
• Zabojska
• Zagor

Trnovo (RS) 
Bogatići
• Grab
• Jablanica
• Kijevo
• Klanac
• Milje
• Podivič
• Rajski Do
• Tošići
• Trnovo
• Turovi
• Ulobići
• Vrbovnik

Vogošća 
Blagovac
• Budišići
• Donja Vogošća
• Garež
• Gora
• Grahovište
• Hotonj
• Kamenica
• Kobilja Glava
• Kremeš
• Krivoglavci
• Ljubina - Poturovići
• Nebočaj
• Perca
• Semizovac
• Svrake
• Tihovići
• Uglješići
• Ugorsko
• Vogošća
• Vrapče

Banovići 
• Banovići
• Borovac
• Ćatići
• Gornji Bučik
• Grivice
• Lozna
• Milići
• Mrgan
• Omazići
• Oskova
• Podgorje
• Pribitkovići
• Repnik
• Seona
• Stražbenica
• Treštenica Donja
• Treštenica Gornja
• Tulovići
• Željova

Banja Luka 
Agino Selo
• Banja Luka
• Barlovci
• Bastasi
• Bistrica
• Bočac
• Borkovići
• Bronzani Majdan
• Cerici
• Čokori
• Debeljaci
• Dobrnja
• Dragočaj
• Drakulić
• Dujakovci
• Goleši
• Ivanjska
• Jagare
• Kmećani
• Kola
• Kola Donja
• Krmine
• Krupa na Vrbasu
• Kuljani
• Lokvari
• Lusići
• Ljubačevo
• Melina
• Motike
• Obrovac
• Pavići
• Pavlovac
• Pervan Donji
• Pervan Gornji
• Piskavica
• Ponir
• Prijakovci
• Priječani
• Prnjavor Mali
• Radmanići
• Radosavska
• Ramići
• Rekavice
• Slavićka
• Stratinska
• Stričići
• Subotica
• Šargovac
• Šimići
• Šljivno
• Verići
• Vilusi
• Zalužani
• Zelenci

Bihać 
Bajrići
• Baljevac
• Bihać
• Brekovica
• Bugar
• Ćukovi
• Doljani
• Donja Gata
• Dubovsko
• Gorjevac
• Grabež
• Grmuša
• Hrgar
• Izačić
• Jankovac
• Jezero
• Kalati
• Klisa
• Klokot
• Kula
• Kulen Vakuf
• Lipa
• Lohovo
• Lohovska Brda
• Mala Peća
• Mali Skočaj
• Međudražje
• Muslići
• Orašac
• Ostrovica
• Papari
• Praščijak
• Pritoka
• Prnjavor
• Račić
• Rajinovci
• Ripač
• Spahići
• Srbljani
• Teočak
• Turija
• Velika Gata
• Veliki Skočaj
• Veliki Stjenjani
• Vikići
• Vrsta
• Zavalje
• Zlopoljac

Assigned after war
• Boboljusci*
• Bosanski Osredci
• Gornji Tiškovac
• Mali Cvjetnić
• Malo Očijevo
• Martin Brod
• Očigrje
• Palučci
• Trubar
• Veliki Cvjetnić
• Veliko Očijevo

Bijeljina 
Amajlije
• Balatun
• Banjica
• Batar
• Batković
• Bijeljina
• Bjeloševac
• Brijesnica
• Brodac Donji
• Brodac Gornji
• Bukovica Donja
• Bukovica Gornja
• Crnjelovo Donje
• Crnjelovo Gornje
• Čađavica Donja
• Čađavica Gornja
• Čađavica Srednja
• Čardačine
• Čengić
• Ćipirovine
• Dazdarevo
• Dragaljevac Donji
• Dragaljevac Gornji
• Dragaljevac Srednji
• Dvorovi
• Glavičice
• Glavičorak
• Glogovac
• Gojsovac
• Golo Brdo
• Hase
• Janja
• Johovac
• Kacevac
• Kojčinovac
• Kovanluk
• Kriva Bara
• Ljeljenča
• Ljeskovac
• Magnojević Donji
• Magnojević Gornji
• Magnojević Srednji
• Međaši
• Modran
• Novo Naselje
• Novo Selo
• Obrijež
• Ostojićevo
• Patkovača
• Piperci
• Popovi
• Pučile
• Ruhotina
• Suho Polje
• Triješnica
• Trnjaci
• Velika Obarska
• Velino Selo
• Vršani
• Zagoni

Bileća 
Baljci
• Bijela Rudina
• Bijeljani
• Bileća
• Bodenik
• Bogdašići
• Brestice
• Čepelica
• Deleuša
• Divin
• Dlakoše
• Dola
• Donja Meka Gruda
• Donji Davidovići
• Đeče
• Fatnica
• Golobrđe
• Gornja Meka Gruda
• Gornji Davidovići
• Granica
• Hodžići
• Kačanj
• Kalac
• Korita
• Krivača
• Krstače
• Kukričje
• Kuti
• Lađevići
• Milavići
• Mirilovići
• Miruše
• Mrežica
• Narat
• Njeganovići
• Oblo Brdo
• Orah
• Orahovice
• Pađeni
• Panik
• Plana
• Podgorje
• Podosoje
• Preraca
• Prijevor
• Prisoje
• Rioca
• Selišta
• Simijova
• Skrobotno
• Šobadine
• Todorići
• Torić
• Trnovica
• Vlahinja
• Vranjska
• Vrbica
• Zasada
• Zaušje
• Zvijerina
• Žudojevići

Bosanska Krupa (FBiH)
Arapuša
• Banjani
• Baštra
• Benakovac
• Bosanska Krupa
• Donja Suvaja
• Drenova Glavica
• Glavica
• Gorinja
• Gornja Suvaja
• Gornji Petrovići
• Gudavac
• Ivanjska
• Jasenica
• Jezerski
• Ljusina
• Mahmić Selo
• Mali Badić
• Mali Radić
• Ostrožnica
• Otoka
• Perna
• Pištaline
• Potkalinje
• Pučenik
• Velika Jasenica
• Veliki Badić
• Veliki Dubovik
• Veliki Radić
• Vojevac
• Voloder
• Vranjska
• Zalin

Krupa na Uni (RS)
Donji Dubovik
• Osredak
• Donji Petrovići
• Gornji Bušević
• Hašani
• Mali Dubovik
• Srednji Bušević
• Srednji Dubovik

Bužim (FBiH)
Bag
• Bužim
• Dobro Selo
• Konjoder
• Lubarda
• Mrazovac
• Varoška Rijeka

Bosanski Petrovac (FBiH) 
Bara
• Bjelaj
• Bjelajski Vaganac
• Bosanski Petrovac
• Bravski Vaganac
• Brestovac
• Bukovača
• Busije
• Cimeše
• Dobro Selo
• Janjila
• Jasenovac
• Kapljuh
• Klenovac
• Kolunić
• Krnja Jela
• Krnjeuša
• Lastve
• Medeno Polje
• Oraško Brdo
• Oštrelj
• Prkosi
• Rašinovac
• Revenik
• Risovac
• Skakavac
• Smoljana
• Suvaja
• Vedro Polje
• Vođenica
• Vranovina
• Vrtoče

Petrovac (RS)

• Bunara
• Drinić
• Podsrnetica

Bosansko Grahovo 
Bastasi
• Bosansko Grahovo
• Crnac
• Crni Lug
• Donje Peulje
• Donji Kazanci
• Donji Tiškovac
• Duler
• Gornje Peulje
• Gornji Kazanci
• Grkovci
• Isjek
• Jaruga
• Kesići
• Korita
• Luka
• Maleševci
• Malo Tičevo
• Marinkovci
• Mračaj
• Nuglašica
• Obljaj
• Pečenci
• Peći
• Preodac
• Pržine
• Radlovići
• Resanovci
• Stožišta
• Ugarci
• Uništa
• Veliko Tičevo
• Vidovići
• Zaseok
• Zebe

Bratunac 
Abdulići
• Banjevići
• Biljača
• Bjelovac
• Blječeva
• Boljevići
• Brana Bačići
• Bratunac
• Dubravice
• Fakovići
• Glogova
• Hranča
• Hrnčići
• Jagodnja
• Jaketići
• Jelah
• Ježeštica
• Joševa
• Konjevići
• Krasanovići
• Kravica
• Lipenovići
• Loznica
• Magašići
• Mihaljevići
• Mlečva
• Mratinci
• Oćenovići
• Opravdići
• Pirići
• Pobrđe
• Pobuđe
• Podčauš
• Polom
• Rakovac
• Repovac
• Sikirić
• Slapašnica
• Stanatovići
• Suha
• Šiljkovići
• Tegare
• Urkovići
• Vitkovići
• Voljavica
• Vraneševići
• Zagoni
• Zalužje
• Zapolje
• Žlijebac

Brčko 
Bijela
• Boće
• Boderište
• Brčko
• Brezik
• Brezovo Polje
• Brezovo Polje
• Brka
• Brod
• Bukovac
• Bukvik Donji
• Bukvik Gornji
• Buzekara
• Cerik
• Čađavac
• Čande
• Čoseta
• Donji Rahić
• Donji Zovik
• Dubrave
• Dubravice Donje
• Dubravice Gornje
• Gajevi
• Gorice
• Gornji Rahić
• Gornji Zovik
• Grbavica
• Gredice
• Islamovac
• Krbeta
• Krepšić
• Laništa
• Lukavac
• Maoča
• Marković Polje
• Ograđenovac
• Omerbegovača
• Palanka
• Popovo Polje
• Potočari
• Rašljani
• Ražljevo
• Repino Brdo
• Sandići
• Skakava Donja
• Skakava Gornja
• Slijepčevići
• Stanovi
• Šatorovići
• Štrepci
• Trnjaci
• Ulice
• Ulović
• Vitanovići Donji
• Vitanovići Gornji
• Vučilovac
• Vujičići
• Vukšić Donji
• Vukšić Gornji

Breza 
Banjevac
• Breza
• Bukovik
• Bulbušići
• Gornja Breza
• Izbod
• Kamenice
• Koritnik
• Mahala
• Mahmutovića Rijeka
• Nasići
• Očevlje
• Orahovo
• Podgora
• Potkraj
• Prhinje
• Seoce
• Slivno
• Smailbegovići
• Smrekovica
• Sutješćica
• Trtorići
• Vardište
• Vijesolići
• Vlahinje
• Vrbovik
• Založje
• Župča

Brod 
Brod
• Brusnica Mala
• Brusnica Velika
• Donja Barica
• Donja Močila
• Donja Vrela
• Donje Kolibe
• Donji Klakar
• Gornja Barica
• Gornja Močila
• Gornja Vrela
• Gornje Kolibe
• Gornji Klakar
• Grk
• Koraće
• Kričanovo
• Kruščik
• Liješće
• Novo Selo
• Sijekovac
• Unka
• Vinska
• Zborište

Bugojno 
Alibegovići
• Barbarići
• Bašići
• Bevrnjići
• Bode
• Brda
• Bristovi
• Brižina
• Bugojno
• Ceribašići
• Crniče
• Čardaci
• Čavići
• Donji Boganovci
• Drvetine
• Garačići
• Glavice
• Golo Brdo
• Gornji Boganovci
• Goruša
• Gračanica
• Gredine
• Grgići
• Hapstići
• Harambašići
• Hum
• Humac
• Ivica
• Jagodići
• Jazvenik
• Kadirovina
• Kandija
• Karadže
• Kopčić
• Kordići
• Koš
• Kotezi
• Kula
• Kunovci
• Kutlići
• Lenđerovina
• Lug
• Ljubnić
• Maslići
• Medini
• Milanovići
• Mračaj
• Nuhići
• Odžak
• Okolište
• Pavice
• Pirići
• Planinica
• Podripci
• Poriče
• Potočani
• Prijaci
• Rosulje
• Rovna
• Sabljari
• Seferovići
• Servani
• Skrte
• Stojići
• Stolac
• Šići
• Šušljići
• Trge
• Udurlije
• Vedro Polje
• Vesela
• Vileši
• Vrbanja
• Vrpeć
• Vučipolje
• Zanesovići
• Zlavast
• Zlokuće
• Ždralovići

Busovača 
Bare
• Bukovci
• Buselji
• Busovača
• Carica
• Dobraljevo
• Dolac
• Donja Rovna
• Gornja Rovna
• Grablje
• Granice
• Gusti Grab
• Hozanovići
• Hrasno
• Javor
• Jazvine
• Jelinak
• Kaćuni
• Kaonik
• Katići
• Kovačevac
• Krčevine
• Krvavičići
• Kula
• Kupres
• Lončari
• Mehurići
• Merdani
• Mihaljevići
• Milavice
• Nezirovići
• Očehnići
• Oselište
• Podbare
• Podjele
• Podstijena
• Polje
• Prosje
• Putiš
• Ravan
• Skradno
• Solakovići
• Strane
• Stubica
• Šudine
• Turići
• Zarače

Cazin 
Bajrići
• Brezova Kosa
• Bukovica
• Cazin
• Crnaja
• Čajići
• Čizmići
• Ćehići
• Ćoralići
• Donja Barska
• Donja Koprivna
• Donja Lučka
• Glogovac
• Gornja Barska
• Gornja Koprivna
• Gornja Lučka
• Gradina
• Hadžin Potok
• Kapići
• Kličići
• Kovačevići
• Krakača
• Krivaja
• Liđani
• Liskovac
• Ljubijankići
• Majetići
• Miostrah
• Mujakići
• Mutnik
• Osredak
• Ostrožac
• Ostrožac na Uni
• Pećigrad
• Pivnice
• Pjanići
• Podgredina
• Polje
• Ponjevići
• Prošići
• Rošići
• Rujnica
• Skokovi
• Stijena
• Šturlić
• Šturlićka Platnica
• Toromani
• Tržac
• Tržačka Platnica
• Tržačka Raštela
• Urga
• Vilenjača
• Vrelo
• Zmajevac

Čajniče 
Avlija
• Batkovići
• Batotići
• Batovo
• Bezujno
• Borajno
• Brezovice
• Bučkovići na Bezujanci
• Čajniče
• Đakovići
• Glamočevići
• Gložin
• Hunkovići
• Ifsar
• Kamen
• Kapov Han
• Karovići
• Krstac
• Lađevci
• Luke
• Međurječje
• Metaljka
• Milatkovići
• Miljeno
• Mištar
• Podavrelo
• Ponikve
• Prvanj
• Slatina
• Staronići
• Stopići
• Sudići
• Todorovići
• Trpinje
• Tubrojevići
• Zaborak

Čapljina 
Bajovci
• Bivolje Brdo
• Crnići
• Čapljina
• Čeljevo
• Doljani
• Domanovići
• Dračevo
• Dretelj
• Dubravica
• Gabela
• Gabela Polje
• Gnjilišta
• Gorica
• Grabovina
• Hotanj
• Jasenica
• Klepci
• Lokve
• Opličići
• Počitelj
• Prćavci
• Prebilovci
• Sjekose
• Stanojevići
• Struge
• Svitava
• Ševaš Njive
• Šurmanci
• Tasovčići
• Trebižat
• Višići
• Zvirovići

Čelinac 
Balte
• Basići
• Branešci Donji
• Branešci Gornji
• Brezičani
• Crni Vrh
• Čelinac
• Čelinac Gornji
• Dubrava Nova
• Dubrava Stara
• Grabovac
• Jošavka Donja
• Jošavka Gornja
• Kablovi
• Kamenica
• Lađevci
• Lipovac
• Markovac
• Mehovci
• Memići
• Miloševo
• Opsječko
• Popovac
• Skatavica
• Šahinovići
• Šnjegotina Donja
• Šnjegotina Srednja
• Šnjegotina Velika
• Štrbe
• Vijačani Gornji

Čitluk 
Bijakovići
• Biletići
• Blatnica
• Blizanci
• Čalići
• Čerin
• Čitluk
• Dobro Selo
• Dragičina
• Gradnići
• Hamzići
• Krehin Gradac
• Krućevići
• Mali Ograđenik
• Međugorje
• Paoča
• Potpolje
• Služanj
• Tepčići
• Veliki Ograđenik
• Vionica

Derventa 
Agići
• Begluci
• Bijelo Brdo
• Bosanski Dubočac
• Brezici
• Bukovac
• Bukovica Mala
• Bukovica Velika
• Bunar
• Cerani
• Crnča
• Dažnica
• Derventa
• Donja Bišnja
• Donja Lupljanica
• Donji Detlak
• Donji Višnjik
• Drijen
• Gornja Bišnja
• Gornja Lupljanica
• Gornji Božinci
• Gornji Detlak
• Gornji Višnjik
• Gradac
• Gradina
• Kalenderovci Donji
• Kalenderovci Gornji
• Kostreš
• Kovačevci
• Kulina
• Kuljenovci
• Lug
• Lužani
• Lužani Bosanski
• Lužani Novi
• Mala Sočanica
• Mišinci
• Miškovci
• Modran
• Osinja
• Osojci
• Pjevalovac
• Pojezna
• Poljari
• Polje
• Rapćani
• Stanići
• Šušnjari
• Tetima
• Trstenci
• Tunjestala
• Velika
• Velika Sočanica
• Vrhovi
• Zelenike
• Žeravac
• Živinice

Doboj 
Alibegovci
• Božinci Donji
• Brestovo
• Bukovac
• Bukovica Mala
• Bukovica Velika
• Bušletić
• Cerovica
• Cvrtkovci
• Čajre
• Čivčije Bukovičke
• Čivčije Osječanske
• Doboj
• Dragalovci
• Foča
• Glogovica
• Grabovica
• Grapska Donja
• Grapska Gornja
• Jelanjska
• Johovac
• Kladari
• Komarica
• Kostajnica
• Kotorsko
• Kožuhe
• Lipac
• Ljeb
• Ljeskove Vode
• Majevac
• Makljenovac
• Miljkovac
• Mitrovići
• Opsine
• Osječani Donji
• Osječani Gornji
• Osredak
• Ostružnja Donja
• Ostružnja Gornja
• Paležnica Donja
• Paležnica Gornja
• Pločnik
• Podnovlje
• Porječje
• Potočani
• Pridjel Donji
• Pridjel Gornji
• Prisade
• Prnjavor Mali
• Prnjavor Veliki
• Radnja Donja
• Raškovci
• Ritešić
• Sjenina
• Sjenina Rijeka
• Stanari
• Stanovi
• Suho Polje
• Svjetliča
• Ševarlije
• Tekućica
• Tisovac
• Trnjani
• Ularice
• Vranduk
• Zarječa

Doboj East (FBiH) 

Brijesnica Mala
• Brijesnica Velika
• Klokotnica
• Lukavica Rijeka
• Stanić Rijeka

Doboj South (FBiH) 
Matuzići
• Mravići

Donji Vakuf 
Babin Potok
• Babino Selo
• Barice
• Blagaj
• Brda
• Brdo
• Brezičani
• Ćehajići
• Ćemalovići
• Daljan
• Dobro Brdo
• Doganovci
• Dolovi
• Donji Rasavci
• Donji Vakuf
• Đulovići
• Fakići
• Fonjge
• Galešići
• Grabantići
• Gredina
• Grič
• Guvna
• Hemići
• Jablan
• Jemanlići
• Karići
• Keže
• Komar
• Korenići
• Košćani
• Kovačevići
• Krivače
• Kutanja
• Ljuša
• Makitani
• Novo Selo
• Oborci
• Orahovljani
• Petkovići
• Piljužići
• Pobrđani
• Ponjavići
• Potkraj
• Pribraća
• Prisika
• Prusac
• Rasavci
• Rastičevo
• Rudina
• Ruska Pilana
• Sandžak
• Semin
• Silajdževina
• Slatina
• Sokolina
• Staro Selo
• Suhodol
• Sultanovići
• Šahmani
• Šatare
• Šeherdžik
• Šutkovići
• Torlakovac
• Urija
• Vlađevići
• Vrbas
• Vrljaj

Drvar (FBiH) 
Ataševac
• Bastasi
• Brda
• Bunčevac
• Drvar
• Drvar Selo
• Gruborski Naslon
• Kamenica
• Ljeskovica
• Mokronoge
• Motike
• Mrđe
• Podić
• Podovi
• Poljice
• Prekaja
• Šajinovac
• Šipovljani
• Trninić Brijeg
• Vidovo Selo
• Vrtoče
• Zaglavica
• Župa
• Župica

Istočni Drvar (RS)
Potoci
• Srnetica
• Uvala

Foča 
Anđelije
• Bastasi
• Beleni
• Biokovo
• Birotići
• Bogavići
• Borje
• Borovinići
• Brajići
• Brajkovići
• Brod
• Brusna
• Budanj
• Bujakovina
• Bunovi
• Cerova Ravan
• Crnetići
• Čelebići
• Čelikovo Polje
• Ćurevo
• Daničići
• Derolovi
• Drače
• Dragočava
• Dragojevići
• Đeđevo
• Fališi
• Foča
• Glušca
• Godijeno
• Gostičaj
• Govza
• Gradac
• Grandići
• Grdijevići
• Hum
• Huseinovići
• Igoče
• Izbišno
• Jasenovo
• Ječmišta
• Jeleč
• Jošanica
• Kolun
• Kosman
• Kozarevina
• Kozja Luka
• Kratine
• Krna Jela
• Kruševo
• Kunduci
• Kunovo
• Kuta
• Ljubina
• Marevo
• Mazoče
• Meštrevac
• Miljevina
• Mirjanovići
• Mješaji
• Orahovo
• Papratno
• Patkovina
• Paunci
• Poljice
• Popov Most
• Potpeće
• Prevrać
• Prijeđel
• Puriši
• Rijeka
• Slatina
• Susješno
• Škobalji
• Štović
• Šuljci
• Tečići
• Tjentište
• Tođevac
• Toholji
• Trbušće
• Trtoševo
• Tvrdaci
• Velenići
• Vikoč
• Vitine
• Vojnovići
• Vranjevići
• Vrbnica
• Vučevo
• Vukušići
• Zakmur
• Zavait
• Zubovići
• Željevo

Foča-Ustikolina (FBiH)
Bavčići
• Bešlići
• Bunčići
• Cvilin
• Donje Žešće
• Filipovići
• Jabuka
• Kolakovići
• Lokve
• Mazlina
• Mravljača
• Njuhe
• Petojevići
• Podgrađe
• Previla
• Prisoje
• Račići
• Radojevići
• Rodijelj
• Slavičići
• Sorlaci
• Stojkovići
• Ustikolina
• Zabor
• Zebina Šuma

Fojnica
Bakovići
• Bakovićka Citonja
• Banja
• Bistrica
• Botun
• Božići
• Carev Do
• Čemernica
• Djedov Do
• Dragačići
• Dusina
• Fojnica
• Gojevići
• Grabovik
• Gradina
• Klisura
• Kozica
• Kujušići
• Lopar
• Lučice
• Lužine
• Majdan
• Marinići
• Merdžanići
• Mujakovići
• Nadbare
• Obojak
• Oglavak
• Ormanov Potok
• Ostruška Citonja
• Otigošće
• Paljike
• Pločari
• Pločari Polje
• Podcitonja
• Podgora
• Polje Ostružnica
• Polje Šćitovo
• Ponjušina
• Poraće
• Ragale
• Rajetići
• Rizvići
• Selakovići
• Selište
• Sitišće
• Smajlovići
• Šavnik
• Tješilo
• Tovarište
• Turkovići
• Vladići
• Voljevac
• Vukeljići
• Živčići

Gacko 
Avtovac
• Bahori
• Bašići
• Berušica
• Brajićevići
• Branilovići
• Cernica
• Čemerno
• Danići
• Dobrelji
• Domrke
• Donja Bodežišta
• Dramešina
• Dražljevo
• Drugovići
• Dubljevići
• Fojnica
• Gacko
• Gareva
• Gornja Bodežišta
• Gračanica
• Gradina
• Hodinići
• Igri
• Izgori
• Jabuka
• Jasenik
• Jugovići
• Kazanci
• Ključ
• Kokorina
• Kravarevo
• Kula
• Lipnik
• Lončari
• Luka
• Lukovice
• Ljeskov Dub
• Medanići
• Međuljići
• Mekavci
• Melečići
• Miholjače
• Mjedenik
• Mrđenovići
• Muhovići
• Nadinići
• Novi Dulići
• Platice
• Poda
• Pridvorica
• Pržine
• Ravni
• Rudo Polje
• Samobor
• Slivlja
• Soderi
• Srđevići
• Stambelići
• Stari Dulići
• Stepen
• Stolac
• Šipovica
• Šumići
• Ulinje
• Višnjevo
• Vratkovići
• Vrba
• Zagradci
• Zurovići
• Žanjevica

Glamoč 
Babića Brdo
• Biličić
• Crni Vrh
• Ćirići
• Ćoslije
• Dolac
• Dragnjić
• Dubrave
• Đuličan
• Glamoč
• Glavica
• Halapić
• Hasanbegovci
• Hasići
• Hotkovci
• Hozići
• Hrbine
• Isakovci
• Jakir
• Kamen
• Karajzovci
• Karlovac
• Kopić
• Korićna
• Kovačevci
• Krasinac
• Malkočevci
• Malo Selo
• Maslina Strana
• Mladeškovci
• Odžak
• Opačić
• Perduhovo Selo
• Petrovo Vrelo
• Podglavica
• Podgradina
• Podgreda
• Potkraj
• Popovići
• Pribelja
• Prijani
• Radaslije
• Rajićke
• Reljino Selo
• Rore
• Rudine
• Skucani
• Staro Selo
• Stekerovci
• Šumnjaci
• Vagan
• Vidimlije
• Vrba
• Zaglavica
• Zajaruga

Goražde (FBiH)
Ahmovići
• Baćci
• Bahovo
• Bakije
• Bare
• Batkovići
• Bezmilje
• Biljin
• Bogušići
• Borovići
• Boškovići
• Brajlovići
• Bratiš
• Brekovi
• Brezje
• Brijeg
• Budići
• Butkovići
• Butkovići Ilovača
• Crvica
• Čitluk
• Čovčići
• Čurovi
• Ćatovići
• Ćehajići
• Deševa
• Donja Brda
• Donja Bukvica
• Donji Bogovići
• Dučići
• Džindići
• Faočići
• Gaj
• Glamoč
• Gočela
• Goražde
• Gornja Brda
• Gornja Bukvica
• Gornji Bogovići
• Grabovik
• Gunjačići
• Gunjevići
• Gusići
• Guskovići
• Hadžići
• Hrančići
• Ilino
• Ilovača
• Jagodići
• Jarovići
• Kalac
• Kamen
• Kazagići
• Knjevići
• Kodžaga Polje
• Kola
• Kolijevke
• Kolovarice
• Konjbaba
• Konjevići
• Kosače
• Kovači
• Kraboriš
• Kreča
• Kučine
• Kušeši
• Kutješi
• Laleta
• Lukarice
• Markovići
• Mirvići
• Mirvići na Podhranjenu
• Morinac
• Mravi
• Mravinjac
• Mrkovi
• Nekopi
• Orahovice
• Oručevac
• Osanica
• Osječani
• Ostružno
• Ozrenovići
• Paraun
• Perjani
• Pijestina
• Pijevac
• Plesi
• Podhranjen
• Poratak
• Potrkuša
• Prisoje
• Radići
• Radovovići
• Raškovići
• Ratkovići
• Rešetnica
• Ropovići
• Rosijevići
• Sedlari
• Sijedac
• Skravnik
• Slatina
• Sofići
• Spahovići
• Šabanci
• Šašići
• Šehovići
• Šemihova
• Šućurići
• Tupačići
• Ušanovići
• Utješinovići
• Vitkovići
• Vlajčići
• Vraneši
• Vranići
• Vranpotok
• Vrbica
• Vremci
• Vučetići
• Zabus
• Završje
• Zorovići
• Zupčići
• Žigovi
• Žilići

Novo Goražde (RS) 
• Bašabulići
• Blagojevići
• Bogdanići
• Borak Brdo
• Borova
• Bosanje
• Bučje
• Donje Selo*
• Dragolji
• Dragovići
• Džuha
• Đakovići
• Gojčevići
• Gradac
• Hajradinovići
• Hladila
• Hrid
• Hrušanj
• Hubjeri*
• Jabuka
• Kanlići
• Karauzovići
• Karovići
• Kopači
• Kostenik
• Krašići
• Ljeskovik
• Mašići
• Milanovići
• Nevorići
• Novakovići
• Odžak
• Podhomara
• Podkozara Donja*
• Podkozara Gornja
• Podmeljine
• Pribjenovići
• Prolaz
• Pršeši
• Radijevići
• Radmilovići
• Rusanj
• Seoca
• Sopotnica
• Surovi
• Šovšići
• Trebeševo
• Uhotići
• Ustiprača
• Vlahovići
• Zakalje
• Zapljevac
• Zemegresi
• Zidine
• Zorlaci
• Zubovići
• Zubovići u Oglečevi
• Žitovo
• Živojevići
• Žuželo

Gornji Vakuf (FBiH)
Batuša
• Bistrica
• Bojska
• Boljkovac
• Borova Ravan
• Crkvice
• Cvrče
• Dobrošin
• Donja Ričica
• Dražev Dol
• Duratbegov Dolac
• Duša
• Gaj
• Galičica
• Gornja Ričica
• Gornji Mračaj
• Gornji Vakuf
• Grnica
• Hrasnica
• Humac
• Jagnjid
• Jelače
• Jelići
• Kozice
• Krupa
• Kute
• Lužani
• Mačkovac
• Mračaj
• Osredak
• Pajić Polje
• Paloč
• Pidriš
• Ploča
• Podgrađe
• Pridvorci
• Rosulje
• Seferovići
• Seoci
• Smrčevice
• Svilići
• Šugine Bare
• Uzričje
• Vaganjac
• Valice
• Vilić Polje
• Voljevac
• Voljice
• Vrse
• Zastinje
• Ždrimci

Gračanica 
Babići
• Boljanić
• Bosansko Petrovo Selo
• Doborovci
• Donja Lohinja
• Džakule
• Gornja Lohinja
• Gračanica
• Lendići
• Lukavica
• Malešići
• Miričina
• Orahovica Donja
• Orahovica Gornja
• Piskavica
• Pribava
• Prijeko Brdo
• Rašljeva
• Skipovac Donji
• Skipovac Gornji
• Soko
• Stjepan Polje
• Škahovica
• Vranovići

Petrovo (RS)

Kakmuž
• Karanovac
• Krtova
• Porječina
• Petrovo
• Sočkovac

Gradačac (FBiH)
Avramovina
• Biberovo Polje
• Donja Međiđa
• Donje Krečane
• Donji Lukavac
• Donji Skugrić
• Gornja Međiđa
• Gornje Krečane
• Gornji Lukavac
• Gradačac
• Hrgovi Donji
• Jasenica
• Jelovče Selo
• Kerep
• Krčevljani
• Mionica
• Novalići
• Rajska
• Sibovac
• Srnice Donje
• Srnice Gornje
• Tolisa
• Vida
• Vučkovci
• Zelinja Donja
• Zelinja Gornja
• Zelinja Srednja

Pelagićevo (RS) 

• Blaževac
• Pelagićevo
• Donja Tramošnica
• Donje Ledenice
• Gornja Tramošnica
• Gornje Ledenice
• Njivak
• Orlovo Polje
• Porebrice
• Samarevac
• Turić

Gradiška 
Adžići
• Berek
• Bistrica
• Bok Jankovac
• Brestovčina
• Bukovac
• Cerovljani
• Cimiroti
• Čatrnja
• Čelinovac
• Čikule
• Donja Dolina
• Donja Jurkovica
• Donji Karajzovci
• Donji Podgradci
• Dragelji
• Dubrave
• Elezagići
• Gašnica
• Gornja Dolina
• Gornja Jurkovica
• Gornja Lipovača
• Gornji Karajzovci
• Gornji Podgradci
• Gradiška
• Grbavci
• Greda
• Jablanica
• Jazovac
• Kijevci
• Kočićevo
• Kozara
• Kozinci
• Krajišnik
• Kruškik
• Laminci Brezici
• Laminci Dubrave
• Laminci Jaružani
• Laminci Sređani
• Liskovac
• Lužani
• Mačkovac
• Mašići
• Mičije
• Miloševo Brdo
• Miljevići
• Mokrice
• Nova Topola
• Novo Selo
• Orahova
• Orubica
• Petrovo Selo
• Rogolji
• Romanovci
• Rovine
• Samardžije
• Seferovci
• Sovjak
• Srednja Jurkovica
• Šaškinovci
• Trebovljani
• Trnovac
• Trošelji
• Turjak
• Vakuf
• Vilusi
• Vrbaška
• Žeravica

Grude 
Blaževići
• Borajna
• Donji Mamići
• Dragičina
• Drinovačko Brdo
• Drinovci
• Gorica
• Grude
• Jabuka
• Puteševica
• Ružići
• Sovići
• Tihaljina

Han Pijesak 
Babine Gornje
• Berkovina
• Brložnik
• Džimrije
• Gođenje
• Han Pijesak
• Japaga
• Jelovci
• Kraljevo Polje
• Kram
• Krivače
• Kusače
• Malo Polje
• Mrkalji
• Nerići
• Nevačka
• Pjenovac
• Plane
• Podžeplje
• Potkozlovača
• Ravanjsko
• Rečica
• Rijeke
• Rubinići
• Stoborani
• Žeravice

Jablanica
Baćina
• Bijela
• Čehari
• Čivelj
• Dobrigošće
• Dobrinja
• Doljani
• Donja Jablanica
• Donje Paprasko
• Dragan Selo
• Đevor
• Glodnica
• Glogošnica
• Gornje Paprasko
• Jablanica
• Jelačići
• Kosne Luke
• Krstac
• Lendava
• Lug
• Mirke
• Mrakovo
• Ostrožac
• Poda
• Ravna
• Risovac
• Rodići
• Slatina
• Sovići
• Šabančići
• Šanica
• Zlate
• Žuglići

Jajce (FBiH)
• Bare
• Barevo
• Bavar
• Biokovina
• Bistrica
• Borci
• Božikovac
• Bravnice
• Brvanci
• Bučići
• Bulići
• Carevo Polje
• Cvitović
• Ćusine
• Divičani
• 
• Donji Bešpelj
• Doribaba
• Dubrave
• Gornji Bešpelj
• Grabanta
• Grdovo
• Ipota
• Jajce
• Kamenice
• Karići
• Kasumi
• Klimenta
• Kokići
• Krezluk
• Kruščica
• Kuprešani
• Lendići
• Lučina
• Lupnica
• Magarovci
• Mile, Jajce
• Peratovci
• Podlipci
• Podmilačje
• Prudi
• Pšenik
• Rika
• Selište
• Seoci
• Smionica
• Stare Kuće
• Šerići
• Šibenica
• Vinac
• Vrbica
• Vukičevci
• Zdaljevac
• Žaovine

Jezero (RS) 
• Borci
• Čerkazovići
• Drenov Do
• Đumezlije
• Jezero
• Kovačevac
• Ljoljići
• Perućica
• Prisoje

Kakanj 
Alagići
• Bastašići
• Bašići
• Bičer
• Bijele Vode
• Bijelo Polje
• Bilješevo
• Bistrik - Crkvenjak
• Bištrani
• Bjelavići
• Bosna
• Brežani
• Brnj
• Brnjic
• Bukovlje
• Crnač
• Čatići
• Danci
• Desetnik
• Doboj
• Donja Papratnica
• Donji Banjevac
• Donji Kakanj
• Donji Lučani
• Dračići
• Drijen
• Dubovo Brdo
• Dumanac
• Gora
• Gornja Papratnica
• Gornji Banjevac
• Gornji Lučani
• Govedovići
• Gradac
• Groce
• Halinovići
• Haljinići
• Hausovići
• Hodžići
• Hrasno
• Hrastovac
• Ivnica
• Javor
• Jehovina
• Jerevice
• Jezero
• Kakanj
• Karaula
• Karaulsko Polje
• Klanac
• Kondžilo
• Koprivnica
• Kraljevska Sutjeska
• Krševac
• Kučići
• Kujavče
• Lipnica
• Lučići
• Lukovo Brdo
• Marijina Voda
• Miljačići
• Mioči
• Modrinje
• Mramor
• Nažbilj
• Obre
• Papratno
• Pavlovići
• Pedići
• Podbjelavići
• Podborje
• Poljani
• Poljice
• Pope
• Popržena Gora
• Ratanj
• Ribnica
• Ričica
• Rojin Potok
• Saranovići
• Sebinje
• Semetiš
• Seoce
• Slagoščići
• Slapnica
• Slivanj
• Slivnice
• Sopotnica
• Starposle
• Subotinje
• Termoelektrana
• Teševo
• Tičići
• Tršće
• Turalići
• Turbići
• Varalići
• Veliki Trnovci
• Viduša
• Vrtlište
• Vukanovići
• Zagrađe
• Zgošća
• Zlokuće
• Željeznička Stanica Kakanj
• Živalji

Kalesija (FBiH) 
Brezik
• Bulatovci
• Dubnica
• Hrasno Donje
• Hrasno Gornje
• Jeginov Lug
• Jelovo Brdo
• Kalesija
• Kalesija (selo)• Kikači
• Lipovice
• Memići
• Miljanovci
• Petrovice
• Prnjavor
• Rainci Donji
• Rainci Gornji
• Sarači
• Seljublje
• Staro Selo
• Tojšići
• Vukovije Donje
• Vukovije Gornje
• Zolje
• Zukići

Osmaci (RS)
Borogovo
• Caparde
• Gojčin
• Hajvazi
• Kosovača
• Kulina
• Kusonje
• Mahala
• Matkovac
• Osmaci• Rakino Brdo
• Sajtovići
• Šeher
• Viličevići
• Zelina

 Kalinovik (RS)
Bak
• Bojići
• Boljanovići
• Borija
• Božanovići
• Brda
• Bukvica
• Cerova
• Čestaljevo
• Daganj
• Dobro Polje
• Dragomilići
• Dubrava
• Gapići
• Golubići
• Gradina
• Graiseljići
• Gvozno
• Hotovlje
• Hreljići
• Jablanići
• Jažići
• Jelašci
• Jezero
• Kalinovik
• Klinja
• Kolakovići
• Kovačići
• Krbljine
• Kruščica
• Kuta
• Kutine
• Luko
• Ljusići
• Ljuta
• Mekoča
• Mjehovina
• Mosorovići
• Mušići
• Nedavić
• Obadi
• Obalj
• Obrnja
• Osija
• Plačikus
• Pločnik
• Polje
• Popovići
• Porija
• Presjedovac
• Rajac
• Rastovac
• Ruđice
• Sela
• Sijerča
• Sočani
• Strane
• Susječno
• Šivolji
• Tmuše
• Tomišlja
• Trešnjevica
• Trnovica
• Tuhobić
• Ulog
• Unukovići
• Varizi
• Varoš
• Vihovići
• Vlaholje
• Vrhovina
• Vujinovići
• Zelomići

 Kiseljak 
Azapovići
• Badnje
• Behrići
• Bilalovac
• Bliznice
• Boljkovići
• Borina
• Brizje
• Brnjaci
• Bukovica
• Buzuci
• Čalikovac
• Čizma
• Čubren
• Datići
• Demići
• Devetaci
• Doci
• Donji Palež
• Draževići
• Dubrave
• Dugo Polje
• Duhri
• Duke
• Gaj
• Gojakovac
• Gomionica
• Gornji Palež
• Gradac
• Grahovci
• Gromiljak
• Gunjače
• Hadrovci
• Han Ploča
• Hercezi
• Homolj
• Hrastovi
• Ivica
• Jehovac
• Katunište
• Kazagići
• Kiseljak
• Kotačala
• Kovači
• Krčevine
• Križići
• Kuliješ
• Lug
• Ljetovik
• Mahala Gomionica
• Mahala Višnjica
• Male Sotnice
• Markovići
• Maslinovići
• Medovci
• Medovići
• Miroševići
• Mrakovi
• Odrače
• Paretak
• Pariževići
• Pobrđe Milodraž
• Pobrđe Orahovo
• Podastinje
• Podastinjsko Brdo
• Polje Višnjica
• Potkraj
• Radanovići
• Radeljevići
• Rauševac
• Rotilj
• Solakovići
• Stojkovići
• Svinjarevo
• Šahinovići
• Toplica
• Tulica
• Velike Sotnice
• Višnjica
• Zabrđe
• Završje
• Žeželovo

 Kladanj 
Brateljevići
• Brdijelji
• Brgule
• Brlošci
• Buševo
• Crijevčići
• Dole
• Gojakovići
• Gojsalići
• Goletići
• Jelačići
• Jošje
• Kladanj
• Konjevići
• Kovačići
• Krivajevići
• Lupoglavo
• Majdan
• Mala Kula
• Matijevići
• Mladovo
• Noćajevići
• Novo Naselje - Stupari
• Obrćevac
• Olovci
• Pauč
• Pelemiši
• Pepići
• Plahovići
• Prijanovići
• Prijevor
• Ravne
• Rujići
• Starić
• Stupari - Centar
• Stupari - Selo
• Suljići
• Tarevo
• Tuholj
• Velika Kula
• Vranovići
• Vučinići
• Zagrađe

 Ključ (FBiH) 
Biljani Donji
• Biljani Gornji
• Budelj Gornji
• Crljeni
• Donje Ratkovo*
• Donje Sokolovo*
• Donji Ramići
• Donji Vojići
• Dubočani*
• Gornje Ratkovo*
• Gornji Ramići
• Gornji Vojići
• Hadžići
• Hasići
• Hripavci
• Humići
• Jarice*
• Kamičak
• Ključ
• Kopjenica
• Korjenovo
• Krasulje
• Lanište
• Ljubine*
• Međeđe Brdo
• Mijačica
• Peći
• Pištanica
• Plamenice
• Prhovo
• Prisjeka Donja
• Prisjeka Gornja
• Rudenice
• Sanica
• Sanica Donja
• Sanica Gornja
• Velagići
• Velečevo*
• Zavolje
• Zgon

Ribnik (RS)
• Busije
• Crkveno
• Čađavica
• Donja Previja
• Donja Slatina
• Donje Ratkovo*
• Donji Ribnik
• Donje Sokolovo*
• Donji Vrbljani
• Dragoraj
• Dubočani
• Gornja Previja
• Gornja Slatina
• Gornje Ratkovo*
• Gornje Sokolovo
• Gornji Ribnik
• Gornji Vrbljani
• Jarice*
• Ljubine*
• Rastoka
• Sitnica
• Sredice
• Stražice
• Treskavac
• Velijašnica
• Velije
• Velečevo*
• Zableće

 Kneževo (RS)
Bastaji
• Bokani
• Borak
• Bregovi
• Brnjići
• Bunar
• Čarići
• Ćukovac
• Davidovići
• Dobretići
• Donji Orašac
• Golo Brdo
• Gornji Orašac
• Imljani
• Javorani
• Kneževo
• Kobilja
• Kostići
• Kričići - Jejići
• Melina
• Mijatovići
• Milaševci
• Mokri Lug
• Paunovići
• Pavlovići
• Prisika
• Rađići
• Slipčevići
• Šolaji
• Vitovlje Malo
• Vlatkovići
• Vukovići
• Zapeće
• Zasavica
• Zubovići
• Živinice

Dobretići (FBiH)

 Konjic 
Argud
• Bale
• Bare
• Barmiš
• Bijela
• Bjelovčina
• Blace
• Blučići
• Borci
• Boždarevići
• Bradina
• Brđani
• Budišnja Ravan
• Bukovica
• Bukovlje
• Bulatovići
• Bušćak
• Buturović Polje
• Cerići
• Crni Vrh
• Čelebići
• Čelina
• Česim
• Čičevo
• Čuhovići
• Dobričevići
• Dolovi
• Doljani
• Donja Vratna Gora
• Donje Selo
• Donje Višnjevice
• Donji Čažanj
• Donji Gradac
• Donji Nevizdraci
• Donji Prijeslop
• Došćica
• Dubočani
• Dubravice
• Dudle
• Dužani
• Džajići
• Džanići
• Džepi
• Falanovo Brdo
• Gakići
• Galjevo
• Glavatičevo
• Gobelovina
• Gorani
• Goransko Polje
• Gorica
• Gornja Vratna Gora
• Gornje Višnjevice
• Gornji Čažanj
• Gornji Gradac
• Gornji Nevizdraci
• Gostovići
• Grabovci
• Gradeljina
• Grušča
• Hasanovići
• Herići
• Homatlije
• Homolje
• Hondići
• Idbar
• Jasenik
• Javorik
• Jezero
• Ježeprosina
• Jošanica
• Kale
• Kanjina
• Kašići
• Konjic
• Kostajnica
• Koto
• Krajkovići
• Kralupi
• Krtići
• Krupac
• Krušćica
• Kula
• Lađanica
• Lisičići
• Lokva
• Luka
• Lukomir
• Lukšije
• Ljesovina
• Ljubuča
• Ljuta
• Mladeškovići
• Mokro
• Mrkosovice
• Obrenovac
• Obri
• Odžaci
• Orahovica
• Orlište
• Oteležani
• Ovčari
• Pačerani
• Parsovići
• Plavuzi
• Podhum
• Podorašac
• Pokojište
• Polje Bijela
• Požetva
• Prevlje
• Radešine
• Raotići
• Rasvar
• Razići
• Redžići
• Repovci
• Repovica
• Ribari
• Ribići
• Seljani
• Seonica
• Sitnik
• Slavkovići
• Solakova Kula
• Sopot
• Spiljani
• Stojkovići
• Strgonice
• Studenčica
• Sultići
• Svijenča
• Šunji
• Tinje
• Tovarnica
• Treboje
• Trešnjevica
• Trusina
• Tuhobići
• Turija
• Ugošće
• Veluša
• Vinište
• Vrbljani
• Vrci
• Vrdolje
• Zabrđani
• Zabrđe
• Zagorice
• Zaslivlje
• Zukići

 Kotor Varoš 
• Baština
• Bilice
• Bobovice
• Boljanići
• Borci Donji
• Borci Gornji
• Burča
• Ćorkovići
• Dabovci
• Demići
• Donje Šiprage
• Dunići
• Duratovci
• Garići
• Gelići
• Gigovići
• Gornje Šiprage
• Grabovica
• Grič
• Hadrovci
• Hrvaćani
• Jakotina
• Kerle
• Kotor Varoš
• Kovačevići
• Kruševo Brdo I
• Kruševo Brdo II
• Liplje
• Lipovac
• Maljeva
• Maslovare
• Obodnik
• Orahova
• Palivuk
• Pilipovina
• Plitska
• Podbrđe
• Podosoje
• Postoje
• Previle
• Prisočka
• Radohova
• Ravne
• Selačka
• Sokoline
• Stopan
• Šibovi
• Šiprage
• Tovladić
• Tuleža
• Vagani
• Varjače
• Večići
• Viševice
• Vranić
• Vrbanjci
• Vrbovo
• Zabrđe
• Zagrađe
• Zaselje
• Zuhrići

 Kozarska Dubica 
Aginci
• Babinac
• Bačvani
• Bijakovac
• Bjelajci
• Božići
• Brekinja
• Čelebinci
• Čitluk
• Ćuklinac
• Demirovac
• Dizdarlije
• Donja Jutrogošta
• Donja Slabinja
• Donji Jelovac
• Draksenić
• Furde
• Gornja Gradina
• Gornjoselci
• Gradina Donja
• Gunjevci
• Hadžibajir
• Hajderovci
• Jasenje
• Johova
• Jošik
• Kadin Jelovac
• Klekovci
• Knežica
• Komlenac
• Košuća
• Koturovi
• Kozarska Dubica
• Kriva Rijeka
• Maglajci
• Malo Dvorište
• Međeđa
• Međuvođe
• Mirkovac
• Mlječanica
• Mrazovci
• Murati
• Novoselci
• Odžinci
• Parnice
• Pobrđani
• Pucari
• Rakovica
• Sjeverovci
• Sključani
• Sreflije
• Strigova
• Suvaja
• Ševarlije
• Tuključani
• Ušivac
• Veliko Dvorište
• Verija
• Vlaškovci
• Vojskova
• Vrioci

 Kreševo 
Alagići
• Bjelovići
• Botunja
• Bukva
• Crkvenjak
• Crnički Kamenik
• Crnići
• Deževice
• Drežnice
• Gunjani
• Kojsina
• Komari
• Kreševo
• Kreševski Kamenik
• Lipa
• Mratinići
• Pirin
• Poljani
• Polje
• Rakova Noga
• Ratkovići
• Stojčići
• Vidosovići
• Vodovoji
• Volujak
• Vranci
• Zvizd

 Kupres 
Barjamovci
• Begovo Selo
• Bili Potok
• Blagaj
• Botun
• Brda
• Bućovača
• Donje Ravno
• Donje Vukovsko
• Donji Malovan
• Goravci
• Gornje Ravno
• Gornje Vukovsko
• Gornji Malovan
• Kudilji
• Kukavice
• Kupres
• Kute
• Mlakva
• Mrđebare
• Mušić
• Odžak
• Olovo
• Osmanlije
• Otinovci
• Rilić
• Stražbenica
• Suhova
• Vrila
• Zanaglina
• Zlosela
• Zvirnjača

 Kupres 
Mrđanovci
• Novo Selo
• Rastičevo
• Šemenovci

 Laktaši 
Aleksići
• Bakinci
• Bosanski Aleksandrovac
• Boškovići
• Bukovica
• Čardačani
• Ćetojevići
• Devetina
• Dovići
• Drugovići
• Glamočani
• Jablan
• Jakupovci
• Jaružani
• Kadinjani
• Kobatovci
• Koljani
• Kosijerovo
• Kriškovci
• Krnete
• Laktaši
• Ljubatovci
• Maglajani
• Mahovljani
• Malo Blaško
• Milosavci
• Miloševci
• Mrčevci
• Papažani
• Petoševci
• Rajčevci
• Riječani
• Slatina
• Šeškovci
• Šušnjari
• Trn
• Veliko Blaško

 Livno 
Bila
• Bilo Polje
• Bogdaše
• Bojmunte
• Čaić
• Čaprazlije
• Čelebić
• Čuklić
• Ćosanlije
• Dobro
• Donji Rujani
• Drinova Međa
• Držanlije
• Golinjevo
• Gornji Rujani
• Grborezi
• Grgurići
• Gubin
• Komorani
• Kovačić
• Lipa
• Lištani
• Livno
• Lopatice
• Lusnić
• Ljubunčić
• Mali Guber
• Mali Kablići
• Miši
• Odžak
• Orguz
• Podgradina
• Podgreda
• Podhum
• Potkraj
• Potočani
• Potok
• Priluka
• Prisap
• Prolog
• Provo
• Radanovci
• Rapovine
• Sajković
• Smričani
• Srđevići
• Strupnić
• Suhača
• Tribić
• Veliki Guber
• Veliki Kablići
• Vidoši
• Vrbica
• Vržerala
• Zabrišće
• Zagoričani
• Zastinje
• Žabljak
• Žirović

 Lopare (RS)

Bobetino Brdo
• Brezje*
• Brijest
• Brnjik*
• Brusnica
• Bučje
• Jablanica
• Koraj
• Koretaši
• Kozjak
• Labucka
• Lipovice
• Lopare
• Lukavica*
• Mačkovac
• Miladići*
• Milino Selo
• Mirosavci
• Mrtvica
• Peljave
• Piperi
• Pirkovci
• Podgora
• Priboj
• Pukiš
• Puškovac
• Smiljevac
• Tobut
• Vakuf
• Vukosavci

Čelić (FBiH)
• Brezje*
• Brnjik*
• Bučje*
• Čelić
• Drijenča
• Humci
• Lukavica*
• Miladići*
• Nahvioci
• Ratkovići
• Šibošnica
• Velino Selo
• Visori
• Vražići

 Lukavac 
Babice Donje
• Babice Gornje
• Berkovica
• Bikodže
• Bistarac Donji
• Bistarac Gornji
• Bokavići
• Borice
• Brijesnica Donja
• Brijesnica Gornja
• Caparde
• Cerik
• Crveno Brdo
• Devetak
• Dobošnica
• Gnojnica
• Huskići
• Jaruške Donje
• Jaruške Gornje
• Kalajevo
• Komari
• Kruševica
• Lukavac
• Lukavac Gornji
• Mičijevići
• Milino Selo
• Modrac
• Orahovica
• Poljice
• Prline
• Prokosovići
• Puračić
• Smoluća Donja
• Smoluća Gornja
• Semići
• Sižje
• Stupari
• Šikulje
• Tabaci
• Tumare
• Turija
• Vasiljevci
• Vijenac

 Ljubinje 
Bančići
• Dubočica
• Gleđevci
• Grablje
• Gradac
• Ivica
• Kapavica
• Krajpolje
• Krtinje
• Kruševica
• Ljubinje
• Mišljen
• Obzir
• Pocrnje
• Pustipusi
• Rankovci
• Ubosko
• Vlahovići
• Vođeni
• Žabica
• Žrvanj

 Ljubuški 
Bijača
• Cerno
• Crnopod
• Crveni Grm
• Dole
• Grab
• Grabovnik
• Gradska
• Greda
• Grljevići
• Hardomilje
• Hrašljani
• Humac
• Kašće
• Klobuk
• Lipno
• Lisice
• Ljubuški
• Miletina
• Mostarska Vrata
• Orahovlje
• Otok
• Pregrađe
• Proboj
• Prolog
• Radišići
• Stubica
• Studenci
• Šipovača
• Teskera
• Vašarovići
• Veljaci
• Vitina
• Vojnići
• Zvirići

 Maglaj 
Adže
• Bakotić
• Bijela Ploča
• Bradići Donji
• Bradići Gornji
• Brezici
• Brezove Dane
• Brusnica
• Čobe
• Čusto Brdo
• Domislica
• Donja Bočinja
• Donja Bukovica
• Donja Paklenica
• Donji Rakovac
• Donji Ulišnjak
• Globarica
• Gornja Bočinja
• Gornja Bukovica
• Gornja Paklenica
• Gornji Rakovac
• Gornji Ulišnjak
• Grabovica
• Jablanica
• Kamenica
• Komšići
• Kopice
• Kosova
• Krsno Polje
• Liješnica
• Lugovi
• Ljubatovići
• Maglaj
• Matina
• Misurići
• Mladoševica
• Moševac
• Novi Šeher
• Oruče
• Osojnica
• Ošve
• Parnica
• Pire
• Poljice
• Ponijevo
• Radojčići
• Radunice
• Rajnovo Brdo
• Ravna
• Rječica Donja
• Rječica Gornja
• Straište
• Striježevica
• Strupina
• Trbuk
• Tujnica

 Modriča 
Babešnica
• Botajica
• Čardak
• Dobra Voda
• Dobrinja
• Dugo Polje
• Garevac
• Kladari Donji
• Kladari Gornji
• Koprivna
• Kužnjača
• Miloševac
• Modriča
• Riječani Donji
• Riječani Gornji
• Skugrić Gornji
• Tarevci
• Vranjak

 Mostar (FBiH)
Bačevići
• Banjdol
• Blagaj
• Bogodol
• Buna
• Cim
• Čule
• Dobrč
• Donja Drežnica
• Donji Jasenjani
• Dračevice
• Gnojnice
• Goranci
• Gornja Drežnica
• Gornje Gnojnice
• Gornji Jasenjani
• Gubavica
• Hodbina
• Humilišani
• Ilići
• Jasenica
• Kosor
• Kremenac
• Krivodol
• Kružanj
• Kutilivač
• Lakševine
• Malo Polje
• Miljkovići
• Mostar
• Ortiješ
• Pijesci
• Podgorani
• Podgorje
• Podvelež
• Polog
• Potoci
• Prigrađani
• Raška Gora
• Raštani
• Ravni
• Rodoč
• Selište
• Slipčići
• Sovići
• Sretnice
• Striževo
• Vihovići
• Vojno
• Vranjevići
• Vrapčići
• Vrdi
• Željuša
• Žitomislići

Istočni Mostar (RS)
• Kamena
• Kokorina
• Zijemlje

 Mrkonjić Grad 
Baljvine
• Bjelajce
• Brdo
• Dabrac
• Donja Pecka
• Donja Podgorja
• Donji Baraći
• Donji Graci
• Dubica
• Gerzovo
• Gornja Pecka
• Gornja Podgorja
• Gornji Baraći
• Gornji Graci
• Gustovara
• Jasenovi Potoci
• Kopljevići
• Kotor
• Liskovica
• Magaljdol
• Majdan
• Medna
• Mlinište
• Mrkonjić Grad
• Oćune
• Okandžije
• Orahovljani
• Podbrdo
• Podorugla
• Podrašnica
• Stupari
• Surjan
• Šehovci
• Šibovi
• Trijebovo
• Trnovo
• Ubavića Brdo
• Vlasinje

 Neum 
Babin Do
• Borut
• Brestica
• Broćanac
• Brštanica
• Cerovica
• Cerovo
• Crnoglav
• Dobri Do
• Dobrovo
• Donji Drijen
• Donji Zelenikovac
• Dubravica
• Duži
• Glumina
• Gornje Hrasno
• Gradac
• Hotanj Hutovski
• Hutovo
• Kiševo
• Moševići
• Neum
• Prapratnica
• Previš
• Rabrani
• Vinine
• Žukovica

 Nevesinje 
Batkovići
• Bežđeđe
• Biograd
• Bojišta
• Borovčići
• Bratač
• Budisavlje
• Donja Bijenja
• Donji Drežanj
• Donji Lukavac
• Dramiševo
• Gaj
• Gornja Bijenja
• Gornji Drežanj
• Gornji Lukavac
• Grabovica
• Hrušta
• Humčani
• Jasena
• Jugovići
• Kifino Selo
• Kljen
• Kljuna
• Kovačići
• Krekovi
• Kruševljani
• Lakat
• Luka
• Miljevac
• Nevesinje
• Odžak
• Plužine
• Podgrađe
• Postoljani
• Presjeka
• Pridvorci
• Prkovići
• Rabina
• Rast
• Rilja
• Rogače
• Seljani
• Slato
• Sopilja
• Studenci
• Šehovina
• Šipačno
• Trusina
• Udrežnje
• Zaborani
• Zalom
• Zalužje
• Zovi Do
• Žiljevo
• Žuberin
• Žulja

 Novi Grad 
Ahmetovci
• Blagaj Japra
• Blagaj Rijeka
• Blatna
• Cerovica
• Crna Rijeka
• Čađavica Donja
• Čađavica Gornja
• Čađavica Srednja
• Ćele
• Devetaci
• Dobrljin
• Donje Vodičevo
• Donji Agići
• Donji Rakani
• Gornja Slabinja
• Gornje Vodičevo
• Gornji Agići
• Gornji Rakani
• Grabašnica
• Grdanovac
• Gumnjani
• Hozići
• Johovica
• Jošava
• Kalenderi
• Kostajnica
• Kršlje
• Kuljani
• Lješljani
• Mala Krupska Rujiška
• Mala Novska Rujiška
• Mala Žuljevica
• Maslovare
• Matavazi
• Mazić
• Mrakodol
• Mraovo Polje
• Novi Grad
• Petkovac
• Petrinja
• Pobrđani
• Podoška
• Poljavnice
• Prusci
• Radomirovac
• Rakovac
• Rašće
• Ravnice
• Rudice
• Sokolište
• Suhača
• Svodna
• Tavija
• Trgovište
• Vedovica
• Velika Rujiška
• Velika Žuljevica
• Vitasovci
• Zovik

 Novi Travnik 
Balići
• Bistro
• Božići
• Bučići
• Budušići
• Bugojčići
• Bukvići
• Čakići
• Čehova
• Dahovo
• Donje Pećine
• Duboko
• Đakovići
• Gornje Pećine
• Hadžići
• Has
• Isakovići
• Kasapovići
• Kopila
• Kovačići
• Krnjića Potok
• Lisac
• Margetići
• Monjići
• Nević Polje
• Nova Opara
• Novi Travnik
• Opara
• Orašac
• Pečuj
• Petačići
• Potočani
• Pribilovići
• Pričani
• Rankovići
• Rastovci
• Rat
• Reput
• Ruda
• Sebešić
• Seona
• Sinokos
• Stojkovići
• Šenkovići
• Torine
• Trenica
• Trnovac
• Turalići
• Vejzovići
• Vodovod
• Zenepići
• Zubići

 Odžak (FBiH)
Ada
• Donja Dubica
• Donji Svilaj
• Gnionica
• Gornja Dubica
• Gornji Svilaj
• Novi Grad
• Novo Selo*
• Odžak
• Posavska Mahala
• Potočani*
• Srnava*
• Vrbovac

Vukosavlje (RS)
Ada*
• Gnionica
• Jakeš
• Jošavica
• Modrički Lug
• Pećnik
• Potočani*
• Srnava*

 Olovo 
Ajdinovići
• Arapovača
• Bakići
• Berisalići
• Boganovići
• Brda
• Bukov Do
• Čude
• Čuništa
• Dolovi
• Drecelj
• Dugandžići
• Glavično
• Gornji Drapnići
• Grabovica
• Gurdići
• Jelaške
• Kamensko
• Klinčići
• Kolakovići
• Kovačići
• Krajišići
• Križevići
• Kruševo
• Lišci
• Magulica
• Metilji
• Milankovići
• Olovo
• Olovske Luke
• Petrovići
• Ponijerka
• Ponor
• Prgoševo
• Pušino Polje
• Radačići
• Rečica
• Rijeka
• Slivnje
• Solun
• Stojčići
• Šaševci
• Vukotići
• Žunova

 Orašje 
Bok
• Bukova Greda
• Donja Mahala
• Kopanice
• Kostrč
• Matići
• Orašje
• Tolisa
• Ugljara
• Vidovice

Donji Žabar (RS)
Čović Polje
• Donji Žabar• Jenjić
• Lepnica
• Lončari
• Oštra Luka

 Posušje 
Bare
• Batin
• Broćanac
• Čitluk
• Gradac
• Konjsko
• Osoje
• Podbila
• Poklečani
• Posušje
• Rastovača
• Sutina
• Tribistovo
• Vinjani
• Vir
• Vrpolje
• Vučipolje
• Zagorje
• Zavelim

 Prijedor 
Ališići
• Babići
• Bistrica
• Bišćani
• Božići
• Brđani
• Brezičani
• Briševo
• Busnovi
• Cikote
• Crna Dolina
• Čarakovo
• Čejreci
• Čirkin Polje
• Ćela
• Dera
• Donja Dragotinja
• Donja Ravska
• Donji Garevci
• Donji Orlovci
• Donji Volar
• Gaćani
• Gomjenica
• Gornja Dragotinja
• Gornja Jutrogošta
• Gornja Puharska
• Gornja Ravska
• Gornji Garevci
• Gornji Jelovac
• Gornji Orlovci
• Gornji Volar
• Gradina
• Hambarine
• Hrnići
• Jaruge
• Jelićka
• Jugovci
• Kalajevo
• Kamičani
• Kevljani
• Kozarac
• Kozaruša
• Krivaja
• Lamovita
• Ljeskare
• Ljubija
• Malo Palančište
• Marićka
• Marini
• Miljakovci
• Miska Glava
• Niševići
• Ništavci
• Omarska
• Orlovača
• Pejići
• Petrov Gaj
• Prijedor
• Rakelići
• Rakovčani
• Raljaš
• Rasavci
• Rizvanovići
• Saničani
• Šurkovac
• Tisova
• Tomašica
• Trnopolje
• Veliko Palančište
• Zecovi
• Žune

 Prnjavor 
Babanovci
• Brezik
• Crkvena
• Čivčije
• Čorle
• Doline
• Donja Ilova
• Donja Mravica
• Donji Galjipovci
• Donji Palačkovci
• Donji Smrtići
• Donji Štrpci
• Donji Vijačani
• Drenova
• Gajevi
• Galjipovci
• Gornja Ilova
• Gornja Mravica
• Gornji Galjipovci
• Gornji Palačkovci
• Gornji Smrtići
• Gornji Štrpci
• Gornji Vijačani (dio)
• Grabik Ilova
• Gusak
• Hrvaćani
• Husrpovci
• Jadovica
• Jasik
• Kokori
• Konjuhovci
• Karać
• Kremna
• Kulaši
• Lišnja
• Lužani
• Maćino Brdo
• Mračaj
• Mravica
• Mujinci
• Naseobina Babanovci
• Naseobina Hrvaćani
• Naseobina Lišnja
• Novo Selo
• Okolica
• Orašje
• Otpočivaljka
• Paramije
• Pečeneg Ilova
• Popovići
• Potočani
• Prnjavor
• Prosjek
• Puraći
• Ralutinac
• Ratkovac
• Skakavci
• Šarinci
• Šereg Ilova
• Šibovska
• Štivor
• Velika Ilova
• Vršani

 Prozor-Rama 
Blace
• Borovnica
• Dobroša
• Donja Vast
• Donji Krančići
• Donji Višnjani
• Družinovići
• Duge
• Gmići
• Gorica
• Gornji Krančići
• Gornji Višnjani
• Gračac
• Gračanica
• Grevići
• Heljdovi
• Here
• Hudutsko
• Ivanci
• Jaklići
• Klek
• Kovačevo Polje
• Kozo
• Kućani
• Kute
• Lapsunj
• Lizoperci
• Lug
• Ljubunci
• Maglice
• Meopotočje
• Mluša
• Ometala
• Orašac
• Pajići
• Paljike
• Parcani
• Paroš
• Ploča
• Podbor
• Proslap
• Prozor
• Ravnica
• Ripci
• Rumboci
• Skrobućani
• Šćipe
• Šćit
• Šerovina
• Šlimac
• Tošćanica
• Trišćani
• Ustirama
• Uzdol
• Varvara
• Zahum

 Rogatica 
Agarovići
• Babljak
• Beći
• Begzadići
• Beheći
• Berkovići
• Bjelogorci
• Blažujevići
• Borač
• Borika
• Borovac
• Borovsko
• Božine
• Brankovići
• Brčigovo
• Brda
• Brezje
• Bulozi
• Burati
• Čadovina
• Čavčići
• Čubrići
• 
• Dobrašina
• Dobromerovići
• Dobrouščići
• Drobnići
• Dub
• Dumanjići
• Đedovići
• Ferizovići
• Gazije
• Godomilje
• Golubovići
• Grivci
• Gučevo
• Guždelji
• Jarovići
• Jasenice
• Kamen
• Karačići
• Kopljevići
• Kovanj
• Kozarde
• Kozići
• Kramer Selo
• Krvojevići
• Kujundžijevići
• Kukavice
• Kusuci
• Lađevine
• Laze
• Lepenica
• Lubardići
• Ljubomišlje
• Mahala
• Maravići
• Medna Luka
• Mesići
• Mislovo
• Mrgudići
• Nahota
• Obrtići
• Okruglo
• Orahovo
• Osovo
• Otričevo
• Pašić Kula
• Pavičina Kula
• Pešurići
• Pijevčići
• Planje
• Pljesko
• Plješevica
• Podgaj
• Pokrivenik
• Pribošijevići
• Pripećak
• Prosječeno
• Purtići
• Radič
• Rađevići
• Rakitnica
• Ribioc
• Rogatica
• Rusanovići
• Seljani
• Sjemeć
• Sjeversko
• 
• Sočice
• Stara Gora
• Starčići
• Stari Brod
• Stjenice
• Stop
• Strmac
• Sudići
• Surovići
• Šatorovići
• Šena Krena
• Šetići
• Šljedovići
• Šljivno
• Štavanj
• Trnovo
• Varošište
• Vragolovi
• Vratar
• Vražalice
• Vrelo
• Vrlazje
• Zagajevi
• Zagorice
• Zakomo
• Ziličina
• Žepa
• Živaljevići
• Živaljevina

 Rudo 
Arbanasi
• Arsići
• Bare
• Bijelo Brdo
• Biševići
• Bjelugovina
• Bjelušine
• Bjeljevine
• Blizna
• Boranovići
• Bovan
• Božovići
• Budalice
• Cvrkote
• Čavdari
• Danilovići
• Dolovi
• Donja Rijeka
• Donja Strmica
• Donje Cikote
• Donji Ravanci
• Dorići
• Dubac
• Dugovječ
• Džihanići
• Gaočići
• Gojava
• Gornja Rijeka
• Gornja Strmica
• Gornje Cikote
• Gornji Ravanci
• Grabovik
• Grivin
• Janjići
• Knjeginja
• Kosovići
• Kovači
• Kula
• Ljutava
• Međurečje
• Mikavice
• Mioče
• Misajlovina
• Mokronozi
• Mrsovo
• Nikolići
• Obrvena
• Omačina
• Omarine
• Oputnica
• Orah
• Oskoruša
• Past
• Pazalje
• Peljevići
• Petačine
• Plema
• Pohare
• Polimlje
• Popov Do
• Prebidoli
• Pribišići
• Prijevorac
• Radoželje
• Rakovići
• Ravne Njive
• Resići
• Rudo
• Rupavci
• Setihovo
• Sokolovići
• Stankovača
• Staro Rudo
• Strgači
• Strgačina
• Šahdani
• Štrpci
• Trbosilje
• Trnavci
• Trnavci kod Rudog
• Ustibar
• Uvac
• Vagan
• Viti Grab
• Zagrađe
• Zarbovina
• Zlatari
• Zubač
• Zubanj

 Sanski Most (FBiH)
Batkovci
• Bjeline
• Bojište
• Bosanski Milanovac
• Bošnjaci
• Brdari
• Budimlić Japra
• Čaplje
• Demiševci
• Donja Kozica
• Donja Tramošnja
• Donji Dabar
• Donji Kamengrad
• Donji Lipnik
• Duge Njive
• Dževar
• Đedovača
• Đurići
• Fajtovci
• Garevica
• Glavice
• Gorice
• Gornja Kozica
• Gornja Tramošnja
• Gornji Dabar
• Gornji Kamengrad
• Gornji Lipnik
• Grdanovci
• Hadrovci
• Halilovci
• Hazići
• Hrustovo
• Husimovci
• Ilidža
• Jelašinovci
• Kijevo
• Kljevci
• Koprivna
• Kozin
• Krkojevci
• Kruhari
• Lukavice
• Lušci Palanka
• Lužani
• Majkić Japra Donja
• Majkić Japra Gornja
• Marini
• Miljevci
• Modra
• Mrkalji
• Naprelje
• Okreč
• Oštra Luka
• Otiš
• Ovanjska
• Podbriježje
• Podlug
• Podovi
• Podvidača
• Poljak
• Praštali
• Sanski Most
• Sasina
• Skucani Vakuf
• Slatina
• Stara Rijeka
• Stari Majdan
• Suhača
• Šehovci
• Škrljevita
• Tomina
• Trnova
• Usorci
• Vrhpolje
• Zenkovići

Oštra Luka (RS)

 Sokolac 
Baltići
• Bandin Odžak
• Banja Lučica
• Barnik
• Bećari
• Bereg
• Bijela Voda
• Bjelasovići
• Bjelosavljevići
• Borovac
• Brejakovići
• Bukovik
• Cvrčići
• Čavarine
• Čitluci
• Donje Babine
• Donje Gire
• Donji Drapnići
• Donji Kalimanići
• Džindići
• Đedovci
• Gazivode
• Gornji Kalimanići
• Gornji Poretak
• Grbići
• Hrastišta
• Imamovići
• Jabuka
• Jasik
• Kadića Brdo
• Kalauzovići
• Kaljina
• Kazmerići
• Klečkovac
• Knežina
• Košutica
• Kruševci
• Kula
• Kusače
• Kuti
• Mandra
• Mangurići
• Margetići
• Medojevići
• Meljine
• Mičivode
• Miletci
• Miletine
• Nehorići
• Nepravdići
• Novo Selo
• Novoseoci
• Ozerkovići
• Parževići
• Pavičići
• Pediše
• Pihlice
• Pobratci
• Podkrajeva
• Podromanija
• Preljubovići
• Prinčići
• Pusto Selo
• Ravna Romanija
• Rijeća
• Rudine
• Selišta
• Sijerci
• Smrtići
• Sokolac
• Sokolovići
• Šahbegovići
• Šenkovići
• Širijevići
• Točionik
• Turkovići
• Vidrići
• Vraneši
• Vrapci
• Vražići
• Vrhbarje
• Vrhovina
• Vrutci
• Vukosavljevići
• Zagrađe
• Žljebovi
• Žulj
• Žunovi

 Srbac 
Bajinci
• Bardača
• Bosanski Kobaš
• Brezovljani
• Brusnik
• Crnaja
• Ćukali
• Donja Lepenica
• Donji Kladari
• Donji Srđevići
• Dugo Polje
• Gaj
• Glamočani
• Gornja Lepenica
• Gornji Kladari
• Gornji Srđevići
• Ilićani
• Inađol
• Kaoci
• Korovi
• Kukulje
• Lilić
• Nova Ves
• Novi Martinac
• Nožičko
• Povelič
• Prijebljezi
• Rakovac
• Razboj Ljevčanski
• Razboj Župski
• Resavac
• Seferovci
• Selište
• Sitneši
• Sitneši Mali
• Srbac
• Srbac
• Stari Martinac
• Vlaknica

 Srebrenica 
Babuljice
• Bajramovići
• Beširevići
• Blažijevići
• Bostahovine
• Božići
• Brakovci
• Brezovice
• Brežani
• Bučinovići
• Bučje
• Bujakovići
• Crvica
• Čičevci
• Dimnići
• Dobrak
• Donji Potočari
• Fojhar
• Gaj
• Gladovići
• Gođevići
• Gornji Potočari
• Gostilj
• Kalimanići
• Karačići
• Klotjevac
• Kostolomci
• Krnjići
• Krušev Do
• Kutuzero
• Liješće
• Likari
• Lipovac
• Luka
• Ljeskovik
• Mala Daljegošta
• Međe
• Miholjevine
• Milačevići
• Moćevići
• Nogačevići
• Obadi
• Opetci
• Orahovica
• Osatica
• Osmače
• Osredak
• Pale
• Palež
• Peći
• Pećišta
• Petriča
• Podgaj
• Podosoje
• Podravno
• Postolje
• Poznanovići
• Pribidoli
• Pribojevići
• Prohići
• Pusmulići
• Radoševići
• Radovčići
• Rađenovići
• Ratkovići
• Sase
• Skelani
• Skenderovići
• Slatina
• Srebrenica
• Staroglavice
• Sućeska
• Sulice
• Šubin
• Tokoljak
• Toplica
• Urisići
• Velika Daljegošta
• Viogor
• Žabokvica
• Žedanjsko

 Srebrenik 
Babunovići
• Behrami
• Brda
• Brezik
• Brnjičani
• Cage
• Cerik
• Crveno Brdo
• Čekanići
• Ćehaje
• Ćojlučko Polje
• Ćojluk
• Dedići
• Donji Moranjci
• Donji Podpeć
• Donji Srebrenik
• Duboki Potok
• Falešići
• Gornji Hrgovi
• Gornji Moranjci
• Gornji Podpeć
• Gornji Srebrenik
• Huremi
• Jasenica
• Ježinac
• Kiseljak
• Kuge
• Like
• Lipje
• Lisovići
• Luka
• Ljenobud
• Maoča
• Podorašje
• Rapatnica
• Seona
• Sladna
• Srebrenik
• Straža
• Šahmeri
• Špionica Centar
• Špionica Donja
• Špionica Gornja
• Špionica Srednja
• Tinja Donja
• Tinja Gornja
• Tutnjevac
• Uroža
• Zahirovići

 Stolac (FBiH) 
Aladinići
• Barane
• Bjelojevići
• Borojevići
• Burmazi
• Crnići - Greda
• Crnići - Kula
• Do
• Hodovo
• Hrgud
• Komanje Brdo
• Kozice
• Kruševo
• Ošanjići
• Pješivac - Greda
• Pješivac - Kula
• Poprati
• Prenj
• Rotimlja
• Stolac
• Trijebanj

Berkovići (RS)
• Berkovići
• Bitunja
• Brštanik
• Dabrica
• Do
• Hatelji
• Hodovo
• Hrgud
• Ljubljenica
• Ljuti Do
• Meča
• Poplat
• Predolje
• Strupići
• Suzina
• Šćepan Krst
• Trusina
• Žegulja

 Šamac 
Batkuša
• Crkvina
• Donja Slatina
• Donji Hasić
• Gajevi
• Gornja Slatina
• Gornji Hasić
• Kornica
• Kruškovo Polje
• Novo Selo
• Obudovac
• Pisari
• Prud
• Srednja Slatina
• Šamac
• Škarić
• Zasavica

Domaljevac-Šamac (FBiH)
Bazik
• Domaljevac'''
• Brvnik
• Grebnice
• Tišina

Šekovići 
Akmačići
• Ašćerići
• Bašići
• Betanj
• Bobari
• Čanići
• Dobrić
• Džanojevići
• Đurići
• Javor
• Kalabače
• Kaštijelj
• Korijen
• Markovići
• Milovanovići
• Papraća
• Petrovići
• Plazače
• Pobedarje
• Podpola
• Raševo
• Selište
• Strmica
• Stupari
• Sučani
• Šekovići
• Tepen
• Trnovo
• Tupanari
• Udbina
• Velika Njiva
• Vidakovići - Vrela
• Vrelo
• Zupci

Šipovo 
Babići
• Babin Do
• Bešnjevo
• Brđani
• Brdo
• Čifluk
• Čuklić
• Donji Mujdžići
• Dragnić
• Dragnić Podovi
• Duljci
• Đukići
• Gorica
• Gornji Mujdžići
• Grbavica
• Greda
• Jusići
• Kneževići
• Kozila
• Krčevine
• Lipovača
• Lubovo
• Lužine
• Majevac
• Močioci
• Natpolje
• Olići
• Podobzir
• Podosoje
• Popuže
• Pribeljci
• Sarići
• Sokolac
• Stupna
• Šipovo
• Todorići
• Vagan
• Vodica
• Volari
• Vražić

Široki Brijeg 
Biograci
• Buhovo,
• Crne Lokve
• Čerigaj
• Dobrič
• Dobrkovići
• Doci
• Donja Britvica
• Donji Crnač
• Donji Gradac
• Duboko Mokro
• Dužice
• Gornja Britvica
• Gornji Crnač
• Gornji Gradac
• Gornji Mamići
• Grabova Draga
• Izbično
• Jare
• Knešpolje
• Kočerin
• Lise
• Ljubotići
• Ljuti Dolac
• Oklaji
• Podvranić
• Potkraj
• Pribinovići
• Privalj
• Rasno
• Rujan
• Široki Brijeg
• Trn
• Turčinovići
• Uzarići

Teslić 
Banja Vrućica
• Bardaci
• Barići
• Bijelo Bučje
• Blatnica
• Brić
• Buletić
• Čečava
• Donji Očauš
• Donji Ranković
• Donji Ružević
• Dubrave
• Đulići
• Gomjenica
• Gornja Radnja
• Gornja Vrućica
• Gornje Liplje
• Gornji Očauš
• Gornji Ranković
• Gornji Ružević
• Gornji Teslić
• Jasenova
• Jezera
• Kamenica
• Komušina Donja
• Komušina Gornja
• Kuzmani
• Mladikovine
• Osivica
• Parlozi
• Pribinić
• Radešići
• Rajševa
• Rastuša
• Rudo Polje
• Slatina
• Stenjak
• Studenci
• Šnjegotina Gornja
• Teslić
• Ugodnovići
• Ukrinica
• Vlajići
• Žarkovina

Tešanj 
Bejići
• Blaževci
• Bobare
• Bukva
• Cerovac
• Čaglići
• Čifluk
• Dobropolje
• Drinčići
• Džimilić Planje
• Jablanica
• Jelah
• Jelah - Polje
• Jevadžije
• Kalošević
• Karadaglije
• Koprivci
• Kraševo
• Lepenica
• Logobare
• Lončari
• Ljetinić
• Medakovo
• Mekiš
• Miljanovci
• Mrkotić
• Novi Miljanovci
• Novo Selo
• Omanjska
• Orašje Planje
• Piljužići
• Potočani
• Putešić
• Raduša
• Ripna
• Rosulje
• Sivša
• Srednja Omanjska
• Šije
• Tešanj
• Tešanjka
• Trepče
• Tugovići
• Vitkovci
• Vrela
• Vukovo
• Žabljak

Tomislavgrad 
Baljci
• Blažuj
• Bogdašić
• Borčani
• Bukova Gora
• Bukovica
• Cebara
• Crvenice
• Ćavarov Stan
• Dobrići
• Donji Brišnik
• Eminovo Selo
• Galečić
• Gornja Prisika
• Gornji Brišnik
• Grabovica
• Jošanica
• Kazaginac
• Kolo
• Kongora
• Korita
• Kovači
• Krnjin
• Kuk
• Letka
• Lipa
• Liskovača
• Lug
• Mandino Selo
• Mesihovina
• Mijakovo Polje
• Mokronoge
• Mrkodol
• Omerovići
• Omolje
• Oplećani
• Pasić
• Podgaj
• Prisoje
• Radoši
• Rašćani
• Rašeljke
• Raško Polje
• Renići
• Rošnjače
• Sarajlije
• Seonica
• Srđani
• Stipanjići
• Šuica
• Tomislavgrad
• Vedašić
• Vinica
• Vojkovići
• Vranjače
• Vrilo
• Zaljiće
• Zaljut
• Zidine

Travnik 
Bačvice
• Bandol
• Bijelo Bučje
• Bilići
• Brajići
• Brajkovići
• Brankovac
• Čifluk
• Čosići
• Čukle
• Dolac
• Dolac na Lašvi
• Donja Trebeuša
• Donje Krčevine
• Donji Korićani
• Dub
• Đelilovac
• Fazlići
• Gladnik
• Gluha Bukovica
• Goleš
• Gornja Trebeuša
• Gornje Krčevine
• Gornji Korićani
• Gradina
• Grahovčići
• Grahovik
• Guča Gora
• Hamandžići
• Han Bila
• Jezerci
• Kljaci
• Kokošari
• Komar
• Kraljevice
• Krpeljići
• Kula
• Kundići
• Lovrići
• Mala Bukovica
• Maline
• Miletići
• Miškića Brdo
• Mosor
• Mudrike
• Nova Bila
• Orahovo
• Orašac
• Orlice
• Ovčarevo
• Paklarevo
• Podkraj
• Podovi
• Podstinje
• Pokrajčići
• Poljanice
• Polje Slavka Gavrančića
• Prići
• Pulac
• Putićevo
• Radića Brdo
• Radojčići
• Radonjići
• Ričice
• Runjići
• Sažići
• Sečevo
• Seferi
• Selići
• Skomorje
• Slimena
• Suhi Dol
• Šešići
• Šipovik
• Šišava
• Travnik
• Turbe
• Turići
• Varošluk
• Velika Bukovica
• Vidoševići
• Vilenica
• Višnjevo
• Vitovlje
• Vlahovići
• Vranići
• Zagrađe
• Zaselje

Trebinje (RS) 
Aranđelovo
• Arbanaška
• Arslanagića Most
• Baonine
• Begović Kula
• Bihovo
• Bijelač
• Bijograd
• Bioci
• Bodiroge
• Bogojević Selo
• Borilovići
• Brani Do
• Brova
• Budoši
• Bugovina
• Cerovac
• Cicina
• Čvarići
• Desin Selo
• Diklići
• Do
• Dobromani
• Dodanovići
• Dolovi
• Domaševo
• Donja Kočela
• Donje Čičevo
• Donje Grančarevo
• Donje Vrbno
• Donji Orahovac
• Dračevo
• Dražin Do
• Drijenjani
• Dubljani
• Dubočani
• Duži
• Đedići
• Glavinići
• Gojšina
• Gola Glavica
• Gomiljani
• Gornja Kočela
• Gornje Čičevo
• Gornje Grančarevo
• Gornje Vrbno
• Gornji Orahovac
• Grab
• Grbeši
• Grbići
• Grkavci
• Grmljani
• Hum
• Janjač
• Jasen
• Jasenica Lug
• Jazina
• Jušići
• Klikovići
• Klobuk
• Konjsko
• Korlati
• Kotezi
• Kovačina
• Kraj
• Krajkovići
• Kremeni Do
• Krnjevići
• Kučići
• Kunja Glavica
• Kutina
• Lapja
• Lastva
• Lokvice
• Lomači
• Lug
• Lušnica
• Ljekova
• Ljubovo
• Marić Međine
• Mesari
• Mionići
• Morče
• Mosko
• Mrkonjići
• Mrnjići
• Necvijeće
• Nevada
• Nikontovići
• Ograde
• Orašje Popovo
• Orašje Površ
• Orašje Zubci
• Parojska Njiva
• Petrovići
• Pijavice
• Podosoje
• Podštirovnik
• Podstrašivica
• Podvori
• Poljice Čičevo
• Poljice Popovo
• Prhinje
• Pridvorci
• Prosjek
• Rapti Bobani
• Rapti Zupci
• Rasovac
• Sedlari
• Skočigrm
• Staro Slano
• Strujići
• Šarani
• Šćenica Ljubomir
• Taleža
• Todorići
• Trebijovi
• Trebinje
• Tuli
• Tulje
• Turani
• Turica
• Turmenti
• Tvrdoš
• Ubla
• Ugarci
• Ukšići
• Uskoplje
• Uvjeća
• Veličani
• Velja Gora
• Vladušići
• Vlasače
• Vlaška
• Volujac
• Vrpolje Ljubomir
• Vrpolje Zagora
• Vučija
• Vukovići
• Zagora
• Zagradinje
• Zgonjevo
• Žakovo
• Ždrijelovići
• Željevo
• Župa

Ravno (FBiH)
Baljivac
• Belenići
• Bobovišta
• Čavaš
• Cicrina
• Čopice
• Čvaljina
• Diklići
• Dvrsnica
• Glavska
• Golubinac
• Gorogaše
• Grebci
• Ivanica
• Kalađurđevići
• Kijev Do
• Nenovići
• Orah
• Orahov Do
• Ravno
• Rupni Do
• Šćenica Bobani
• Slavogostići
• Slivnica Bobani
• Slivnica Površ
• Sparožići
• Trebimlja
• Trnčina
• Velja Međa
• Vlaka
• Začula
• Zaplanik
• Zavala

Tuzla 
• Brđani
• Breške
• Breze
• Brgule
• Bukinje
• Cerik
• Cviljevina
• Čaklovići Donji
• Čaklovići Gornji
• Čanići
• Dobrnja
• Dokanj
• Dragunja Donja
• Dragunja Gornja
• Gornja Tuzla
• Grabovica Donja
• Grabovica Gornja
• Hudeč
• Husino
• Kiseljak
• Kolimer
• Kolovrat
• Konjikovići
• Kosci
• Kovačevo Selo
• Kovačica
• Krtolije
• Kukovina
• Lipnica
• Lipnica Donja
• Lipnica Gornja
• Lipnica Srednja
• Ljepunice
• Ljubače
• Marinkovići
• Mihatovići
• Milešići
• Morančani
• Mramor
• Mramor Novi
• Obodnica Donja
• Obodnica Gornja
• Orašje
• Osoje
• Par Selo Gornje
• Pasci Donji
• Pasci Gornji
• Petrovice Donje
• Petrovice Gornje
• Plane
• Pogorioci
• Poljana
• Potraš
• Požarnica
• Rapače
• Rasovac
• Simin Han
• Snoz
• Svojtina
• Ševar
• Šići
• Šićki Brod
• Tetima
• Tisovac
• Tuzla
• Vršani

Ugljevik (RS) 
Atmačići
• Bilalići
• Bogutovo Selo
• Donja Krćina
• Donja Trnova
• Glinje
• Gornja Krćina
• Gornja Trnova
• Janjari
• Jasenje
• Jasikovac
• Korenita
• Maleševci
• Mezgraja
• Mukat - Stankovići
• Ravno Polje
• Sarije
• Sniježnica
• Srednja Trnova
• Stari Teočak
• Stari Ugljevik
• Teočak – Krstac
• Tursunovo Brdo
• Tutnjevac
• Ugljevička Obrijež
• Ugljevik
• Zabrđe

Teočak (FBiH)

Vareš
Bijelo Borje
• Blaža
• Borovica Donja
• Borovica Gornja
• Borovičke Njive
• Brda
• Brezik
• Brgule
• Budoželje
• Čamovine
• Ćeće
• Dabravine
• Daštansko
• Debela Međa
• Diknjići
• Dragovići
• Draževići
• Duboštica
• Hodžići
• Ivančevo
• Javornik
• Kadarići
• Karići
• Kokoščići
• Kolovići
• Kopališta
• Kopijari
• Krčevine
• Kunosići
• Letevci
• Ligatići
• Luke
• Ljepovići
• Mijakovići
• Mir
• Mižnovići
• Mlakve
• Naseoci
• Neprivaj
• Oćevija
• Okruglica
• Orah
• Osoje
• Osredak
• Ostrlja
• Pajtov Han
• Pajtovići
• Planinica
• Pobilje
• Podjavor
• Pogar
• Položac
• Poljanice
• Pomenići
• Pržići
• Pržići Kolonija
• Radonjići
• Radoševići
• Ravne
• Rokoč
• Samari
• Semizova Ponikva
• Seoci
• Sjenokos
• Slavin
• Sršljenci
• Strica
• Striježevo
• Stupni Do
• Šikulje
• Tisovci
• Toljenak
• Tribija
• Vareš
• Vareš Majdan
• Vijaka Donja
• Vijaka Gornja
• Višnjići
• Zabrezje
• Zaruđe
• Zubeta
• Zvijezda
• Žalja
• Žižci

Velika Kladuša 
Bosanska Bojna
• Brda
• Bukovlje
• Crvarevac
• Čaglica
• Čelinja
• Dolovi
• Donja Slapnica
• Donja Vidovska
• Elezovići
• Glavica
• Glinica
• Golubovići
• Gornja Slapnica
• Gornja Vidovska
• Grabovac
• Gradina
• Grahovo
• Johovica
• Klupe
• Kudići
• Kumarica
• Mala Kladuša
• Marjanovac
• Miljkovići
• Mrcelji
• Nepeke
• Orčeva Luka
• Podzvizd
• Poljana
• Polje
• Ponikve
• Rajnovac
• Stabandža
• Šabići
• Šestanovac
• Šiljkovača
• Šmrekovac
• Šumatac
• Todorovo
• Todorovska Slapnica
• Trn
• Trnovi
• Vejinac
• Velika Kladuša
• Vrnograč
• Vrnogračka Slapnica
• Zagrad
• Zborište

Visoko 
Arnautovići
• Bare
• Bešići
• Biskupići
• Bradve
• Brezovik
• Buci
• Bulčići
• Buzić Mahala
• Buzići
• Čakalovići
• Čekrčići
• Čifluk
• Ćatići
• Dautovci
• Dobrinje
• Dobro
• Dobro Selo
• Dol
• Dolipolje
• Dolovi
• Donja Vratnica
• Donja Zimća
• Donje Moštre
• Dvor
• Džindići
• Ginje
• Goduša
• Gorani
• Gornja Vratnica
• Gornja Zimća
• Gornje Moštre
• Grad
• Grajani
• Grđevac
• Hadžići
• Hlapčevići
• Jelašje
• Kalići
• Kalotići
• Koložići
• Kondžilo
• Kopači
• Kula Banjer
• Liješevo
• Lisovo
• Loznik
• Lužnica
• Mali Trnovci
• Malo Čajno
• Maurovići
• Mladoš
• Muhašinovići
• Mulići
• Okolišće
• Orašac
• Ozrakovići
• Paljike
• Podvinjci
• Podvinje
• Poklečići
• Poriječani
• Radinovići
• Rajčići
• Ramadanovci
• Ratkovci
• Seoča
• Smršnica
• Srhinje
• Stuparići
• Svinjarevo
• Šošnje
• Taukčići
• Topuzovo Polje
• Tramošnjik
• Tujlići
• Tušnjići
• Upovac
• Uvorići
• Veliko Čajno
• Veruša
• Vidovići
• Vilenjak
• Visoko
• Vrela
• Zagorice
• Zagornica
• Zbilje

Višegrad 
Ajdinovići
• Babin Potok
• Ban Polje
• Barimo
• Batkovica
• Batkušići
• Bijela
• Biljezi
• Bistrivode
• Bjegovići
• Bjeljajci
• Blace
• Blaž
• Bodežnik
• Bogdašići
• Bogilice
• Borovac
• Brezje
• Brodar
• Bursići
• Crijep
• Crnčići
• Crni Vrh
• Čengići
• Češalj
• Ćaćice
• Dobrunska Rijeka
• Donja Brštanica
• Donja Crnča
• Donja Jagodina
• Donja Lijeska
• Donje Dubovo
• Donje Štitarevo
• Donje Vardište
• Donji Dobrun
• Donji Dubovik
• Dragomilje
• Drina
• Drinsko
• Drokan
• Dubočica
• Dušče
• Džankići
• Đipi
• Đurevići
• Faljenovići
• Gazibare
• Glogova
• Gornja Brštanica
• Gornja Crnča
• Gornja Jagodina
• Gornja Lijeska
• Gornje Dubovo
• Gornje Štitarevo
• Gornji Dobrun
• Gornji Dubovik
• Granje
• Greben
• Hadrovići
• Haluge
• Hamzići
• Han Brdo
• Holijaci
• Holijačka Luka
• Hranjevac
• Jablanica
• Jarci
• Jelačići
• Jelašci
• Jelići
• Jezernice
• Kabernik
• Kamenica
• Kapetanovići
• Klašnik
• Klisura
• Kočarim
• Kopito
• Koritnik
• Kosovo Polje
• Kragujevac
• Kuka
• Kupusovići
• Kurtalići
• Kustur Polje
• Lasci
• Loznica
• Macute
• Madžarevići
• Mala Gostilja
• Mangalin Han
• Masali
• Međeđa
• Međuselje
• Menzilovići
• Meremišlje
• Miloševići
• Mirlovići
• Mramorice
• Mušići
• Nebogovine
• Nezuci
• Obravnje
• Odžak
• Okolišta
• Okrugla
• Omerovići
• Oplave
• Orahovci
• Palež
• Paočići
• Pijavice
• Podgorje
• Poljanice
• Polje
• Povjestača
• Pozderčići
• Prelovo
• Presjeka
• Pretiša
• Prisoje
• Raonići
• Repuševići
• Resnik
• Rijeka
• Rodić Brdo
• Rohci
• Rujišta
• Rutenovići
• Rzav
• Sase
• Sendići
• Smriječje
• Staniševac
• Stolac
• Stražbenice
• Šeganje
• Šip
• Šumice
• Trševine
• Tupeši
• Turjak
• Tusta Međ
• Tvrtkovići
• Ubava
• Uništa
• Ušće Lima
• Veletovo
• Velika Gostilja
• Velje Polje
• Velji Lug
• Višegrad
• Višegradska Banja
• Vlahovići
• Vodenice
• Vučine
• Zagorac
• Zakrsnica
• Zanožje
• Zemljice
• Zlatnik
• Žagre
• Žlijeb

Vitez 
Ahmići
• Bila
• Brdo
• Bukve
• Divjak
• Donja Večeriska
• Dubravica
• Gaćice
• Gornja Večeriska
• Jardol
• Kratine
• Krčevine
• Krtine
• Krušćica
• Lupac
• Ljubić
• Mali Mošunj
• Nadioci
• Pirići
• Počulica
• Preočica
• Prnjavor
• Putkovići
• Rijeka
• Sadovače
• Sivrino Selo
• Šantići
• Tolovići
• Veliki Mošunj
• Vitez
• Vraniska
• Vrhovine
• Zabilje
• Zaselje

Vlasenica 
Bačići
• Bakići
• Bešići
• Bijelo Polje
• Bišina
• Brda
• Bukovica Donja
• Bukovica Gornja
• Buljevići
• Cerska
• Derventa
• Donje Vrsinje
• Dragaševac
• Drum
• Dubačko
• Dubnica
• Dukići
• Durakovići
• Durići
• Džemat
• Đile
• Đurđevići
• Gerovi
• Glušac
• Gobelje
• Golići
• Gornje Vrsinje
• Grabovica
• Gradina
• Gunjaci
• Jasen
• Jeremići
• Klještani
• Kojčevina
• Kokanovići
• Koprivno
• Kostrača
• Kozja Ravan
• Krajčinovići
• Kulina
• Kuljančići
• Lukavica
• Lukići
• Maćesi
• Majstorovići
• Milići
• Mišari
• Mišići
• Mršići
• Neđeljišta
• Nova Kasaba
• Nurići
• Odžak
• Pavkovići
• Peševina
• Pijuke
• Plakalovići
• Podbirač
• Podcrkvina
• Podgora
• Pomol
• Pustoše
• Rača
• Rajići
• Raševo
• Rašića Gaj
• Raškovići
• Ristijevići
• Rogosija
• Rovaši
• Rupovo Brdo
• Sebiočina
• Simići
• Skugrići
• Supač
• Šadići Donji
• Šadići Gornji
• Štedra
• Tikvarići
• Toljevići
• Tugovo
• Turalići
• Višnjica
• Vitići
• Vlasenica
• Vrli Kraj
• Vrtoče
• Vukovići
• Vukšići
• Zabrđe
• Zagrađe
• Zaklopača

Zavidovići 
Alići
• Bajvati
• Biljačići
• Borovnica
• Brankovići
• Crnjevo
• Čardak
• Činovići
• Debelo Brdo
• Dišica
• Dolac
• Dolina
• Donja Lovnica
• Donji Junuzovići
• Donji Lug
• Dragovac
• Dubravica
• Džebe
• Gare
• Gornja Lovnica
• Gornje Selo
• Gornji Junuzovići
• Gornji Lug
• Grabovica
• Gostovići
• Hajderovići
• Hrge
• Kamenica
• Karačić
• Krivaja
• Kućice
• Lijevča
• Mahoje
• Majdan
• Miljevići
• Mitrovići
• Mustajbašići
• Osječani
• Osova
• Perovići
• Podvolujak
• Potkleče
• Predražići
• Priluk
• Ribnica (part of settlement)
• Ridžali
• Rujnica
• Skroze
• Suha
• Svinjašnica
• Vinište
• Vozuća
• Vrbica
• Vukmanovići
• Vukovine
• Zavidovići

Zenica 
Arnauti
• Banloz
• Bijele Vode
• Bistrica
• Bistrica Gornja
• Briznik
• Bukovica
• Dobriljevo
• Donja Vraca
• Donji Čajdraš
• Drugavci
• Dusina
• Gladovići
• Gorica
• Gornja Gračanica
• Gornja Višnjica
• Gornja Vraca
• Gornja Zenica
• Gornji Čajdraš
• Gradina
• Gradišće
• Grm
• Gumanci
• Janjac
• Janjići
• Janjićki Vrh
• Jasika
• Jastrebac
• Jurjevići
• Kasapovići
• Klopački Vrh
• Kolići
• Koprivna
• Kovačići
• Kovanići
• Kozarci
• Kula
• Lašva
• Lijeske
• Lokvine
• Loznik
• Ljubetovo
• Mošćanica
• Mutnica
• Nemila
• Novo Selo
• Obrenovci
• Orahovica
• Osojnica
• Osredak
• Palinovići
• Pepelari
• Peševići
• Plahovići
• Plavčići
• Poca
• Pojske
• Ponihovo
• Ponirak
• Puhovac
• Putovičko Polje
• Putovići
• Radinovići
• Sebuja
• Smajići
• Starina
• Stranjani
• Sviće
• Šerići
• Šiblići
• Tišina
• Topčić Polje
• Trešnjeva Glava
• Vranduk
• Vranovići
• Vražale
• Vrhpolje
• Vukotići
• Zahići
• Zenica
• Živkovići

Zvornik 
Androvići
• Baljkovica Donja
• Boškovići
• Buložani
• Čelopek
• Divič
• Donja Pilica
• Donji Lokanj
• Drinjača
• Dugi Dio
• Đevanje
• Đulići
• Glodi
• Glumina
• Gornja Pilica
• Gornji Lokanj
• Grbavci Donji
• Grbavci Gornji
• Gušteri
• Jardan
• Jasenica
• Jusići
• Kamenica Donja
• Kamenica Gornja
• Kiseljak
• Kitovnice
• Klisa
• Kostijerevo
• Kozluk
• Kraljevići
• Križevići
• Kučić Kula
• Kula Grad
• Liješanj
• Liplje
• Malešići
• Marčići
• Mehmedići
• Novo Selo
• Pađine
• Paljevići
• Petkovci
• Potočani
• Roćević
• Rožanj
• Sapna
• Skočić
• Snagovo
• Snagovo Donje
• Snagovo Gornje
• Sopotnik
• Šepak Donji
• Šepak Gornji
• Šetići
• Tabanci
• Trnovica
• Tršić
• Ugljari
• Vrela
• Zelinje
• Zvornik

Sapna (FBiH) 
Baljkovica
• Goduš
• Hanđelići
• Kobilići
• Kovačevići
• Međeđa
• Nezuk
• Rastošnica
• Selimovići
• Skakovica
• Vitinica
• Zaseok

Žepče 
Begov Han
• Bistrica
• Bljuva
• Goliješnica
• Golubinja
• Gornja Golubinja
• Lupoglav
• Ljeskovica
• Ljubna
• Mračaj
• Orahovica
• Ozimica
• Papratnica
• Ravne Donje
• Ravne Gornje
• Selište
• Tatarbudžak
• Varošište
• Vašarište
• Vitlaci
• Želeće
• Željezno Polje
• Žepče

Živinice 
Bašigovci
• Brnjica
• Djedino
• Dubrave Donje
• Dubrave Gornje
• Dunajevići
• Đurđevik
• Gračanica
• Kovači
• Kršići
• Kuljan
• Lukavica Donja
• Lukavica Gornja
• Odorovići
• Priluk
• Spreča
• Suha
• Svojat
• Šerići
• Tupković Donji
• Tupković Gornji
• Višća Donja
• Višća Gornja
• Vrnojevići
• Zelenika
• Zukići
• Živinice
• Živinice Donje
• Živinice Gornje

See also 

 List of settlements in the Federation of Bosnia and Herzegovina
 List of cities in Bosnia and Herzegovina
 Municipalities of Bosnia and Herzegovina
 Municipalities of Republika Srpska

Notes

References 
 Official results from the book: Ethnic composition of Bosnia-Herzegovina population, by municipalities and settlements, 1991. census, Zavod za statistiku Bosne i Hercegovine – Bilten no.234, Sarajevo 1991.
 
 

 
Bosnia and Herzegovina geography-related lists
Bosnia